= 1848 Hungarian parliamentary election =

- 2 June–9 July 1848

All 411 seats in the Diet 206 seats needed for a majority
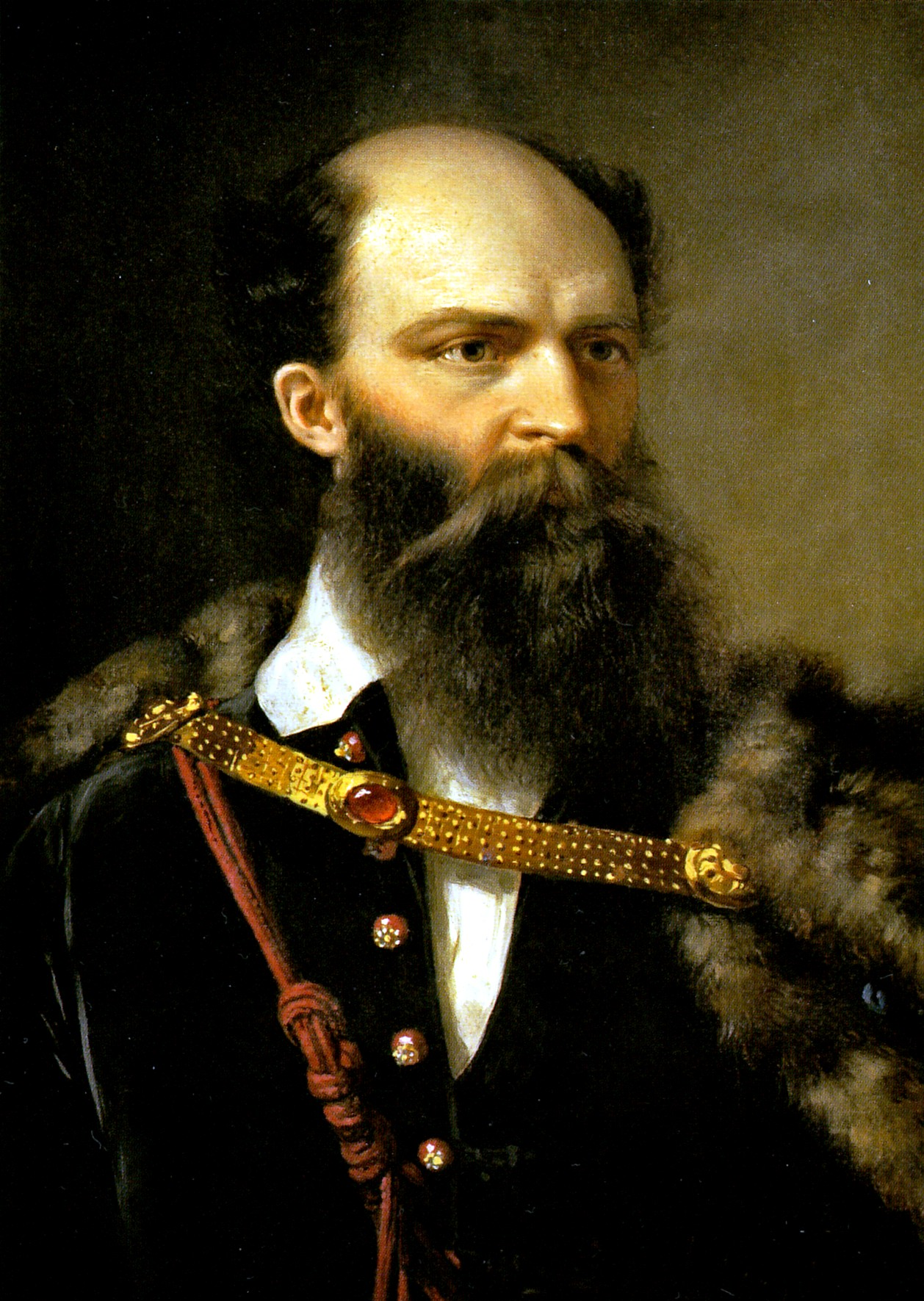

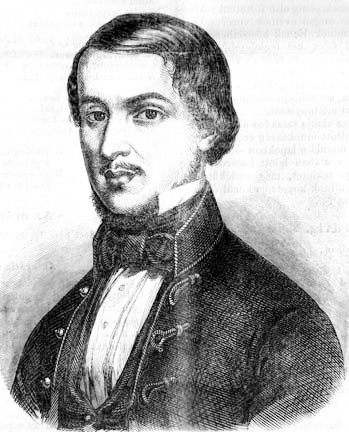
	First party	Second party
Leader	Lajos Batthyány	József Irinyi
Party	EP	RE
Prime Minister before election
Lajos Batthyány
EP
Prime Minister after election
Lajos Batthyány
EP

The elections were held between June 2 and July 9, 1848, in Kingdom of Hungary, Kingdom of Slavonia, and Grand Principality of Transylvania. After the previous parliament (Diet of the Estates) was dissolved on April 11, elections were held based on the adopted Act V of 1848. The seat of the parliament moved from Bratislava to Pest, based on the Act IV of 1848. The government was preoccupied with the action against Anti-Judaist pogroms in April 1848. The serfs emancipation not affected every serfs equally, what caused protest, which the government sometimes put down with military force. The Hungarian government began to take action against the nationalities in May 1848, as they thought of a single political nation and feared separatism, what caused the uprising of the Serbs, Croats and Romanians. The Austrian constitution issued by the emperor sparked another uprising in Vienna, which caused the monarch to move his seat to Innsbruck. The prime minister therefore requested the convening of a new parliament on July 2. King Ferdinand V ordered the convening of the parliament on June 20 and entrusted the palatine, Archduke Stephen, with its opening. The Transylvanian Diet met on May 29, 1848, and voted for the union with Hungary, which the monarch ratified on June 10. The Transylvanian Diet was only dissolved on July 18. Due to the time difference, the election of the Transylvanian representatives was still ongoing when the first modern parliament was opened on July 4.

== Electoral system ==
The elections were based on property, income and education census. Landowners with a ¼ plot of land (between 2.5 – 6.5 ha) or with 100 Ft income, merchants with their own businesses, craftsmen masters and factory owners. In the Royal free cities houses or landowners worth 300 Fts and the citizens. In Transylvania, scientists, surgeons, engineers, teachers, academic artists, members of the Hungarian Academy of Sciences, pharmacists and clergymen could also vote in all cities. In the Transylvanian counties, in Székely Land and Țara Făgărașului (Fogarasföld), those paying the 8 Ft tax and residents of villages consisting of at least 100 households were eligible to vote. 20 years older men were eligible to vote and 24 years older men could be elected. Women had no right for the participation. The elections were held exclusively in single-member district by open voting.

== Results ==
According to the National Assembly Diary, 411 deputies were confirmed in their mandate. 72% of the elected deputies were county nobles and 25% were city citizens. 97% of the new parliament seats were won by those who had previously had the right to vote and were themselves eligible for election. 64 of the deputies belonged to ethnic minorities, with the Croatian and Serbian minorities remaining absent. There was a significant difference between those who met the census and the ethnic composition of the population in Transylvania, where the majority Romanians were less able to meet the elctoral census, despite this, the Romanians had the largest ethnic representation. The majority of the deputies supported the government, the leaders of the radical opposition were Dániel Irányi and József Irinyi. The exact number of the gained seats by parties are unknown.

== Role in the Hungarian Revolution ==
The National Assembly, citing the rebellion of ethnic minorities, rejected the monarch's request for military assistance in the war against the Kingdom of Sardinia, based on the obligation of mutual protection under the Pragmatica Sanctio. The laws passed by the National Assembly were not ratified by the king, and in the absence of an agreement, on September 11, all members of the government, except for the Ministers of the Interior, Defence and Finance, submitted their resignations. On that day Josip Jelačić launched an attack against the Hungarian government under imperial flags. King Ferdinand V appointed Count Franz Lemberg as commander of the Hungarian army on September 25, whose appointment was declared illegal by the National Assembly. And the National Assembly's Defense Committee temporarily took over executive power on September 28. On the same day, a crowd lynched Count Franz Lemberg on the pontoon bridge over the Danube. The king dissolved the National Assembly on October 3 and declared its resolutions since the elections illegal, and at the same time appointed Josip Jelačić as the commander-in-chief of the army. However, the dissolution of the National Assembly de jure was impossible without ministerial confirming signature and the budget for the following year (April Laws). The National Assembly stated in a resolution that the Committee of National Defence, chaired by Lajos Kossuth, would hold executive power until a new government was formed. Both the monarch and the heir to the throne abdicated on December 2, 1848 and Archduke Franz Joseph took the throne. However, the Hungarian National Assembly declared in a resolution that it would not accept the transfer of the throne. On December 16, the imperial main forces launched an attack led, so on December 31, the National Assembly moved its seat to Debrecen. After the success of the Spring Campaign, the National Assembly declared in an open session the dethronement and exile of the House of Habsburg-Lorraine, as well as the independence of the Hungarian State. The resolution was adopted by acclamation and Lajos Kossuth was elected regent-president. On May 2, 1849, Lajos Kossuth appointed Bertalan Szemere as prime minister, who formed a new government. The Imperial Austrian Army with decisive Russian help launched another attack in June 1849, and because of this, the parliament first moved its seat to Szeged, and finally dissolved in Arad on August 13. Lajos Kosuth appointed Artúr Görgei as dictator and resigned along with the members of the Szemere government on August 11, 1849. Two days later Artúr Görgei unconditionally surrendered to the Russians at Șiria (Világos).

== Aftermath ==
In the summer of 1849, several thousand people emigrated to the Ottoman Empire, and 144 people were executed in the course of the reprisals, including Prime Minister Count Lajos Batthyány, Speaker of the House of Magnates Baron Zsigmond Perényi, Notary of the House of Representatives Imre Szacsvay, and Government Commissioners Baron János Jeszenák and László Csány. The majority of those executed were civilians, pastors and notaries who proclaimed the decrees of the Hungarian government. The failure of the Hungarian Revolution was followed by military occupation, and the Kingdom of Hungary became a crown land of the Austrian Empire from 1851.
