= Battle of Schwechat =

Battle during Hungarian Revolution of 1848

Coordinates: 48°08′28″N 16°28′43″E

- Part of the Hungarian Revolution of 1848
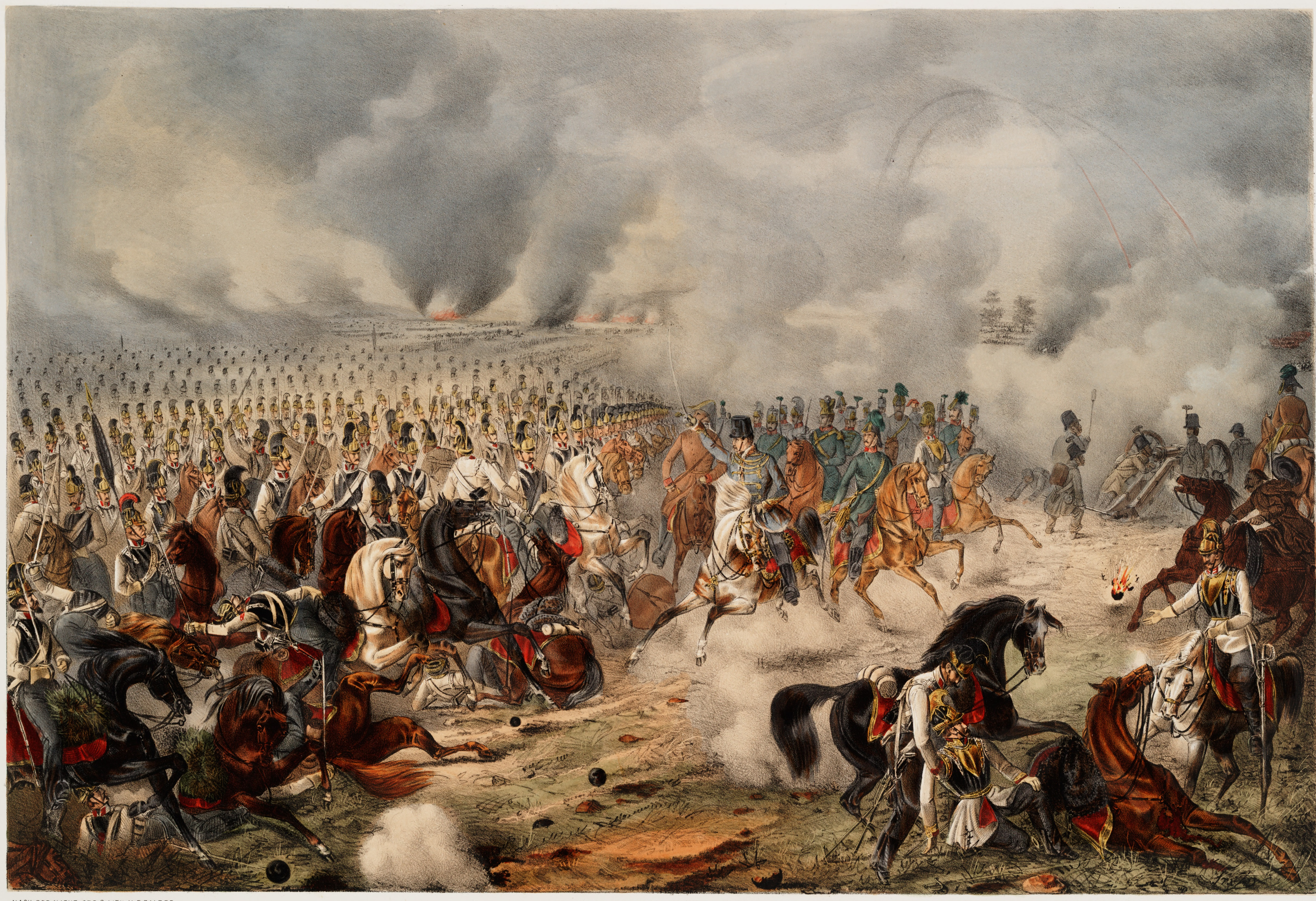
- "The Battle of Schwechat" by Franz Xaver Zalder
Date	30 October 1848
Location	Schwechat, near Vienna, Austria
Result	Austro-Croatian victory: Hungarian advance on Vienna failed

Belligerents
Hungarian Revolutionary Army	Austrian Empire: Croatia

Commanders and leaders
János Móga; Artúr Görgei; Richard Guyon	Josip Jelačić; Alfred I, Prince of Windisch-Grätz; Prince Franz de Paula of Liechtenstein

Strength
27,655 men 82 cannons	33,000 men 75 cannons

Casualties and losses
200–800	22 dead 59/62 wounded 8/12 missing

The Battle of Schwechat was a battle in the Hungarian war of Independence of 1848-1849, fought on 30 October 1848 between the revolutionary Hungarian Army led by Lieutenant General János Móga against the army of the Austrian Empire led by Alfred I, Prince of Windisch-Grätz and Lieutenant General Josip Jelačić, at Schwechat, near Vienna. This was the last battle of 1848 in the Transdanubian campaign. The Hungarian Army wanted to relieve the revolutionaries from Vienna, besieged by the Austrian imperial army, but they were defeated. Vienna fell on the next day.

== Background ==
After the advance of the Croatian troops to the Hungarian-Austrian border which followed the Battle of Pákozd, Jelačić was preparing for another attack, so he stopped at Moson. Here he wanted to wait for reinforcements from Upper Hungary and Vienna, and here he was informed that Ferdinand I, having received the news of the killing by the Hungarian mob from Pest of the royal commissioner and commander-in-chief of the armed forces named by the Austrian government, Count Franz Philipp von Lamberg, the king Ferdinand V. of Hungary dissolved the Hungarian Parliament on 3 October and appointed him the Hungarian King's Commissioner plenipotentiary and commander-in-chief of the armed forces of Hungary. On 6 October, however, another revolution broke out in Vienna, which also claimed the life of the Austrian Minister of War Theodor Franz, Count Baillet von Latour. Thus, now Jelačić marched on to Vienna to subdue the rebels.

By mid-October, the whole of Transdanubia was back in Hungarian hands, and the most important forts and fortresses in the western part of the country, Komárom, Lipótvár and Eszék, were secured. And on 7 October, the popular insurgents led by Artur Görgei and Mór Perczel forced the Croatian corps led by Lieutenant General Franz Karl von Roth to surrender at Ozora, which completed the defeat of the Croatian invasion. The news of the royal manifesto of 3 October - issued right at the moment of Jelačić's flight - helped most of the former officers of the K.u.K. to commit themselves to the Hungarian cause. And the Vienna Revolution also came at the right time, paralyzing the "command center" of the unfolding military counter-revolution for weeks.

After the battle of Pákozd, Lieutenant General János Móga, the Hungarian commander, sent his troops in pursuit of Jelačić. The outbreak of the Vienna Revolution meant that Jelačić's army could not count on any support for some time. On receiving the news of the Vienna revolution, the government commissioner of the Hungarian army in Győr, László Csány, commented: "God grant that it may be true. We here with our troops are enthusiastic".

After the Vienna Revolution, it seemed natural that the Hungarian army would rush to the aid of Vienna. But there were strong military and political arguments against crossing the border. Jelačić's army had been significantly changed by the beginning of October. His cavalry was reinforced and his valueless militia troops, which, due to their lack of discipline, caused the defeat from 29 September, returned to Croatia. Crossing the Austrian border meant for the Hungarians the danger that the army would have to face not only the Croatian troops but also the K.u.K. troops, which had been pushed out of Vienna by the revolutionaries. This - besides the superiority of the enemy - would have caused a serious moral conflict between the Hungarian conscripts sworn to the common monarch and the officers who came from the K.u.K. army.

So the generals and officers were waiting for a political decision. Thus the Hungarian Parliament decided that if the Vienna revolutionaries would call on the Hungarian army to help, then it would have to go to help them. In Vienna, however, neither the Imperial Assembly nor its committee, nor even the city council, were willing to formally ask for help, although most of their members privately approved the Hungarian army's entry. Jelačić was not behaving clearly (in favor or against the revolutionaries) either, and most of the politicians in the imperial city naively hoped that some way of reaching an agreement with the court would be found. The political will for joint action was therefore lacking on both sides.

In the meantime, the manifesto of 3 October in particular kept the mood in Pest in a state of excitement, and the House of Representatives, at its session of 7 October, adopted a resolution, which stated that the government should be entrusted to the Committee of National Defence (which will act after this as a Hungarian government), whose chairman was unanimously proclaimed Lajos Kossuth.

On 18 October, the Croatian force which arrived to Vienna consisted of more than 26,000 men and 75 guns. However, with the joining to them by the imperial garrison pushed out from Vienna by the revolutionaries, it numbered 37 battalions, 42 cavalry regiments, and 138 guns, or at least 40,000 troops at the lowest estimate. The Hungarian army pursuing Jelačić numbered 20,760 troops with 60 guns on 11 October, but due to the continuous joining of units to it, their number grew to 21,025 troops with 53 guns on 20 October and 26,890 troops with 82 guns on 26 October. Despite this, the Croatian army held a qualitative and quantitative advantage, and the light and heavy cavalry regiments that had joined Jelačić made up for the Croatian army's earlier weakness, the lack of cavalry. Jelačić's troops, united with the garrison troops led by Count Adolf of Auersperg, who had been pushed out of Vienna, outnumbered the Hungarian army, while the forces of the Viennese insurgents, which, while they theoretically could reinforce the Hungarians, were hardly usable outside the city walls against regular troops. As such, even a joint Hungarian-Viennese military operation would not have guaranteed success.

== Prelude ==
While the Austrian army was taking measures against the rebellious Vienna, Móga also departed towards the Austrian capital. After the 3-day truce with Jelačić had expired, the Hungarian army finally left its camp near Martonvásár, following the enemy without any definite aim. The vanguard of the army, which under the command of Major Imre Ivánka consisted of 4 battalions of mobile noble guards, a division of volunteer cavalry from Cegléd, Kőrös and Kecskemét, a company of hussars and a battery, left Martonvásár at 6 o'clock on 3 October and arrived in Győr on 5 October, which Jelačić's rearguard left the same morning. On 6 and 7 October the rest of Móga's army arrived in Győr, and on the 8th the advance guard, reinforced by eight companies of hussars, reached Parndorf, from where the next day it began to pursue the enemy towards Bruck an der Leitha, killing some Croatian soldiers and taking about 300 prisoners. After the pursuit was over, Ivánka pushed his outposts forward to Lajta, occupying the river' line between Wilfleinsdorf and Hollern, while he received orders from the army headquarters not to cross the border, and if his outposts had already done so, to withdraw them immediately. On 10 October the bulk of the Hungarian army arrived and set up camp on the hills behind the border, with headquarters at Parndorf. Here Móga convened a council of war, which had to decide whether it was advisable and right to pursue Jelačić's army over the Austrian border. Several people spoke in favor of the continuation of the pursuit, but the majority had the opinion that the border crossing should not be carried out unless the Austrian legislature specifically requested the Hungarian government to send the army to their aid. The Hungarian House of Representatives declared that it would gladly send armed aid to the besieged people of Vienna, so that they could defend themselves against the imperial troops, and immediately sent József Irinyi, a member of the House of Representatives, with the message to the Austrian Imperial Assembly. On the afternoon of 17 October, Móga, upon the order of the political leadership, sent the outposts, commanded by newly arrived Colonel Artúr Görgei, forward over the Lajta river. However, after the Austrian provincial assembly had a reluctant stance about the offer of the Hungarian House of Representatives, Kossuth ordered Móga to abandon any offensive actions and to confine himself to the defense of the borders. The calm did not last long, however, for on the morning of October 21 the whole army moved to cross the Lajta, but when its edge reached Stixneusiedel, Móga again ordered the retreat, whereupon the army retreated again on October 22 to its original positions to await the arrival of the prospective reinforcements.

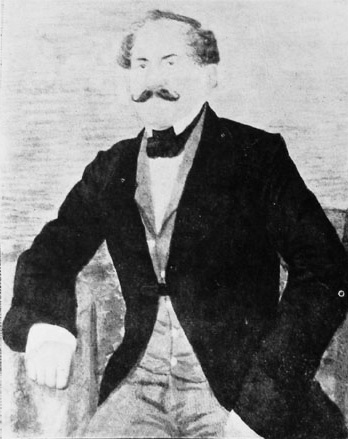
János Móga

The imperial commander-in-chief, Field Marshal Alfred I, Prince of Windisch-Grätz was in Prague, when on 7 October, he received the first news of the Vienna Revolution. On 9 October, he mobilized the imperial troops and the garrisons from Bohemia, and with the help of the railways, he transported his troops under Vienna by 23 October. Now the Austrıan army under Vienna was an army of 80,000 (59 battalions and 2 companies of infantry, 68 cavalry companies, 210 guns). On 27 October Windisch-Grätz issued the order for a general attack on Vienna. The balance of power had thus shifted definitively in favor of the Austrian Imperial Army.

Kossuth, in order to put an end to the instability and uncertainty in the camp from Parndorf, on 17 October, set out from the capital with a squadron of Wilhelm Hussars, additional units of the 25th Honvéd battalion, 1,500 national guards from Pest, and 3 artillery batteries on boats towards Móga's camp; in the meantime, he was joined by national guards everywhere, so that by the time he reached Miklósfalva on 23 October, the relief troops he had brought with him had been increased to 12,000 men. After his arrival, Kossuth held a council of war with the officers present to receive him, and in his introductory speech he spoke enthusiastically in favor of resuming the offensive operations in order to relieve Vienna. The new attack was preceded by serious discussions. In the councils of war, a battle of military and political arguments was fought. Móga and his chief of staff, Colonel Josef Kollmann, opposed the idea of a new border crossing, citing the enemy's superior strength and the lack of training of the Hungarian troops.

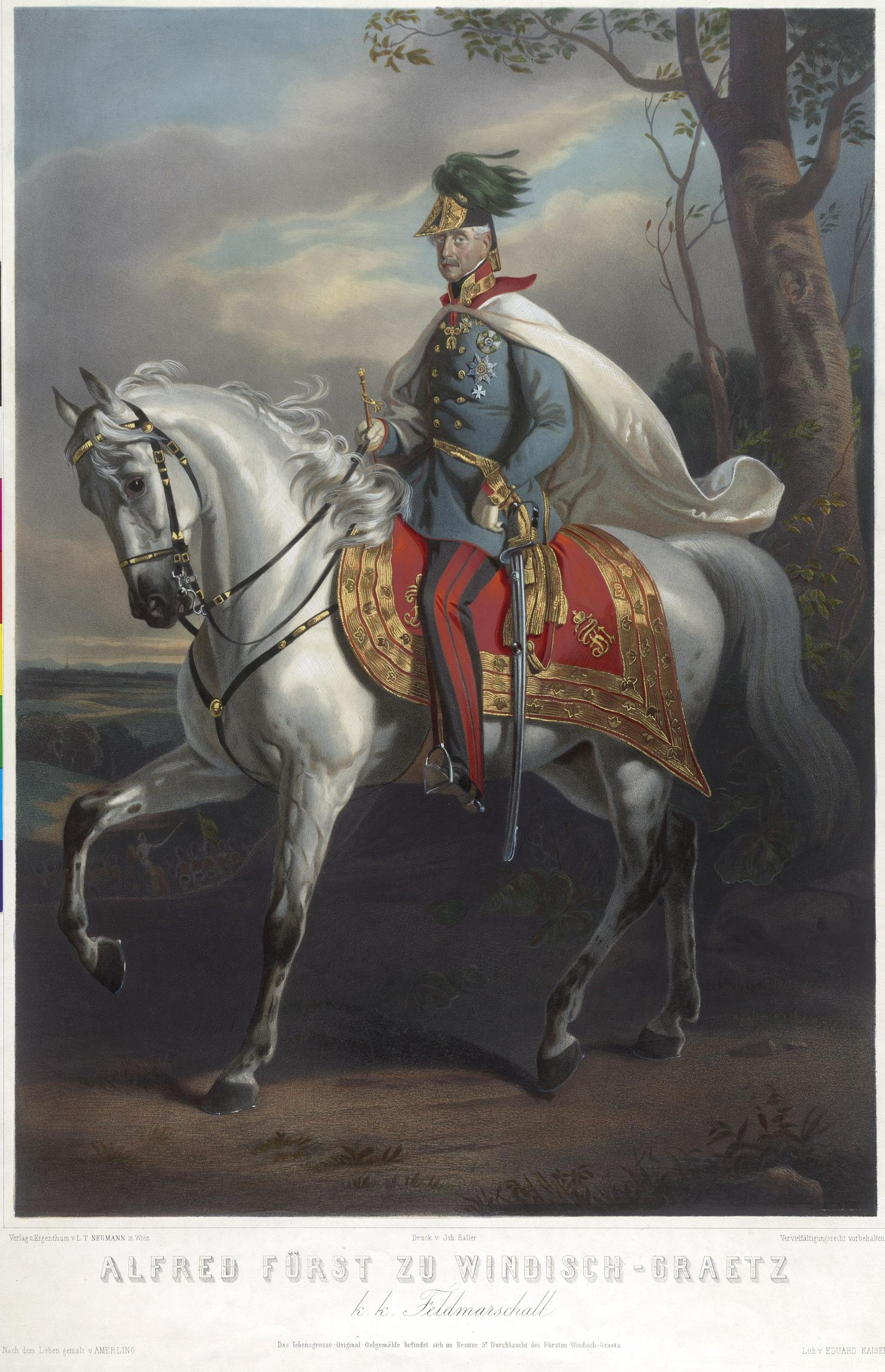
Alfred zu Windisch-Graetz Litho

Kossuth argued that ’’our cause, only linked to the cause of Vienna, is a European cause - separated from it, it will not be taken into account by anyone’’. His practical argument was that if they did not attack now, most of the National Guards would return home without having been used by the army. But if despite all this, "the leaders of our army all say that if we advance, our army will be lost, I will not order a strategic impossibility". But he added, that if there is an officer who says that, even if a victory could not be achieved, but at least the army could be saved, he is ready to hand over to him the command and give the order to attack the Austrians.

There was such an officer. Colonel Görgei declared that "there is no choice, we must go forward, because if we don't, we will lose [as a result of this] more than if we lose three battles". Kossuth was happy upon hearing this and wanted to put him in charge of the main command, but Görgei refused.

Windisch-Grätz, meanwhile, in an order sent to Móga, ordered the K.u.K. officers in the Hungarian army to go immediately to the Austrian camp, or face the most serious consequences. Móga communicated this call to Kossuth and the officers, who were encouraged to freely decide if they want to leave the Hungarian army or to stay. As a result, some 30 imperial officers - among them Major General Ádám Teleki and Major General Franz Holtsche - asked to be relieved from further service, while those who remained solemnly declared that they would continue to fight with all their heart and soul for the Hungarian cause, even against Windisch-Grätz's troops if necessary.

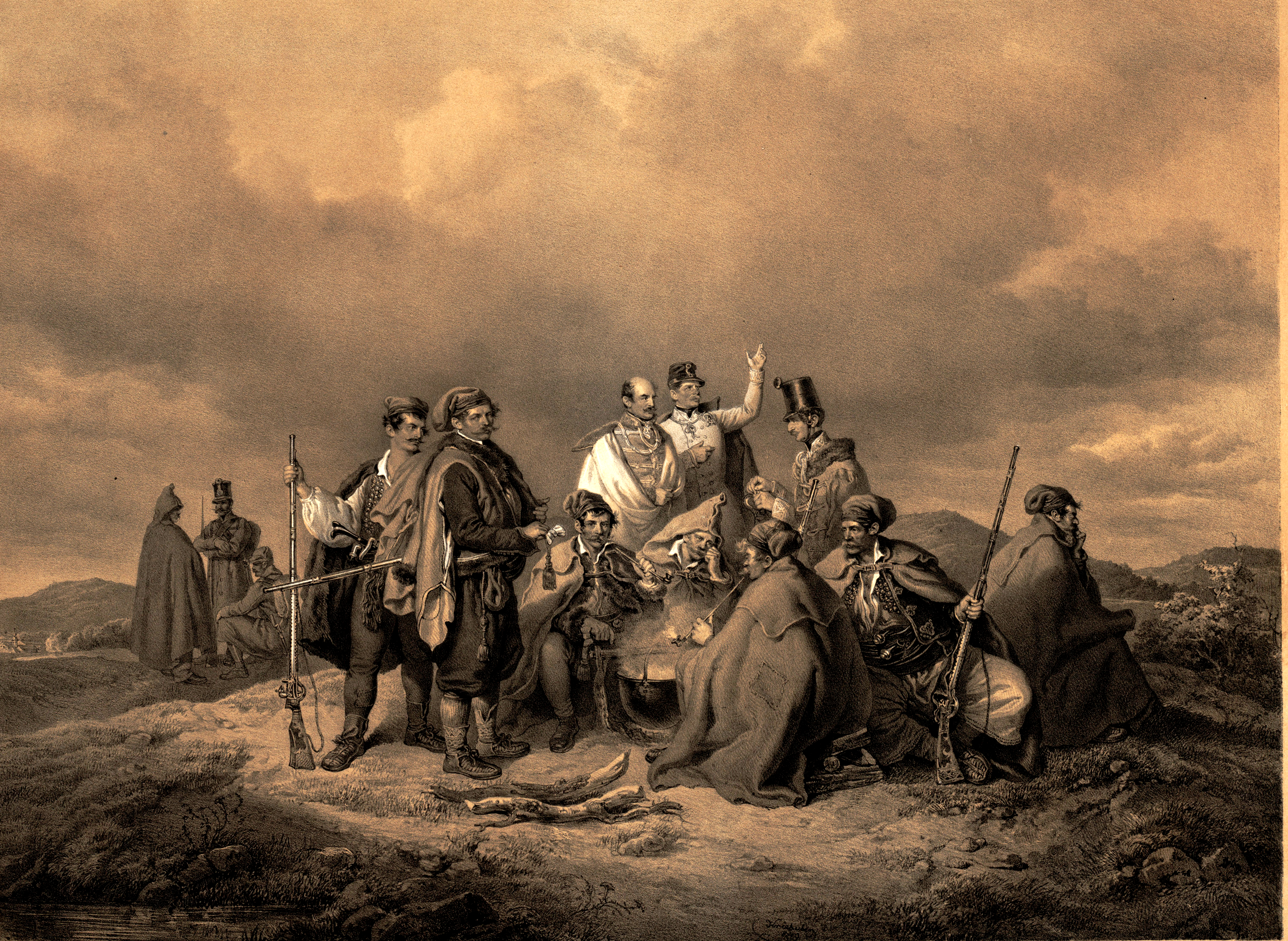
Bivouc Kriehuber Litho

On 25 October, Kossuth, in response to the above-mentioned order of Windisch-Grätz, wrote a reply to the Field Marshal, pointing out that the Hungarian kingdom was an independent state, whose rights and constitution were guaranteed by an agreement concluded with the Habsburg kings centuries before, and that the Hungarian Revolution of 15 March was only a confirmation of the Habsburg-Hungarian alliance (by regaining rights, which had been illegally taken away from the Hungarians by the Habsburg governments during the previous centuries), he accused the Austrian government of violating the treaty by sending Jelačić against the Hungarians, and by stirring the nationalities from Hungary to rebel against the Hungarians, with the purpose to crush Hungarian independence. Then Kossuth accused Windisch-Grätz himself, of having allied with the retreating "traitor" Josip Jelačić against Vienna and the Hungarians, thus openly admitting that the Croatian army was sent against the Hungarians by the Austrian government itself. Then, pointing out that the Hungarians had defeated Jelačić at Pákozd and captured Roth's corps at Ozora, he asked Windisch-Grätz to cease hostilities, end the siege of Vienna and to ensure the unity of the empire by peace. The letter was signed by Kossuth, as chairman of the Committee of National Defence (Országos Honvédelmi Bizottmány), Dénes Pázmándy, as chairman of the Parliament, and László Csányi, as government commissioner. The letter was taken by Imre Ivánka to Windisch-Grätz's headquarters in Hetzendorf. The Field Marshal simply replied, "I do not bargain with rebels!"

Windisch-Grätz, after expressing his wish that Ivánka, who had previously served under him, should return to the Emperor's loyalty, dismissed him, but when Ivánka tried to return to the Hungarian camp, Jelačić's soldiers captured him.

The statement of Windisch-Grätz and the capture of Ivánka aroused vehement indignation in the Hungarian camp, and if some of the officers had hitherto agreed with some reserve to the idea of marching Austrian territory, now a sense of revenge arose in all of them so that even those who were hesitant, were now in favor of launching the attack as soon as possible.

In consequence of this, Móga's measures for the advance having been taken, the army, divided into three columns, crossed the Lajta in the morning of 28 October, and advanced with the right flank column to Fischamend, with the center to the heights east of Enzersdorf an der Fischa, and with the left flank column to Margarethen am Moos, and after the march was completed, pushed its outposts on the line Schwadorf-Klein-Neusiedl-Fischamend.

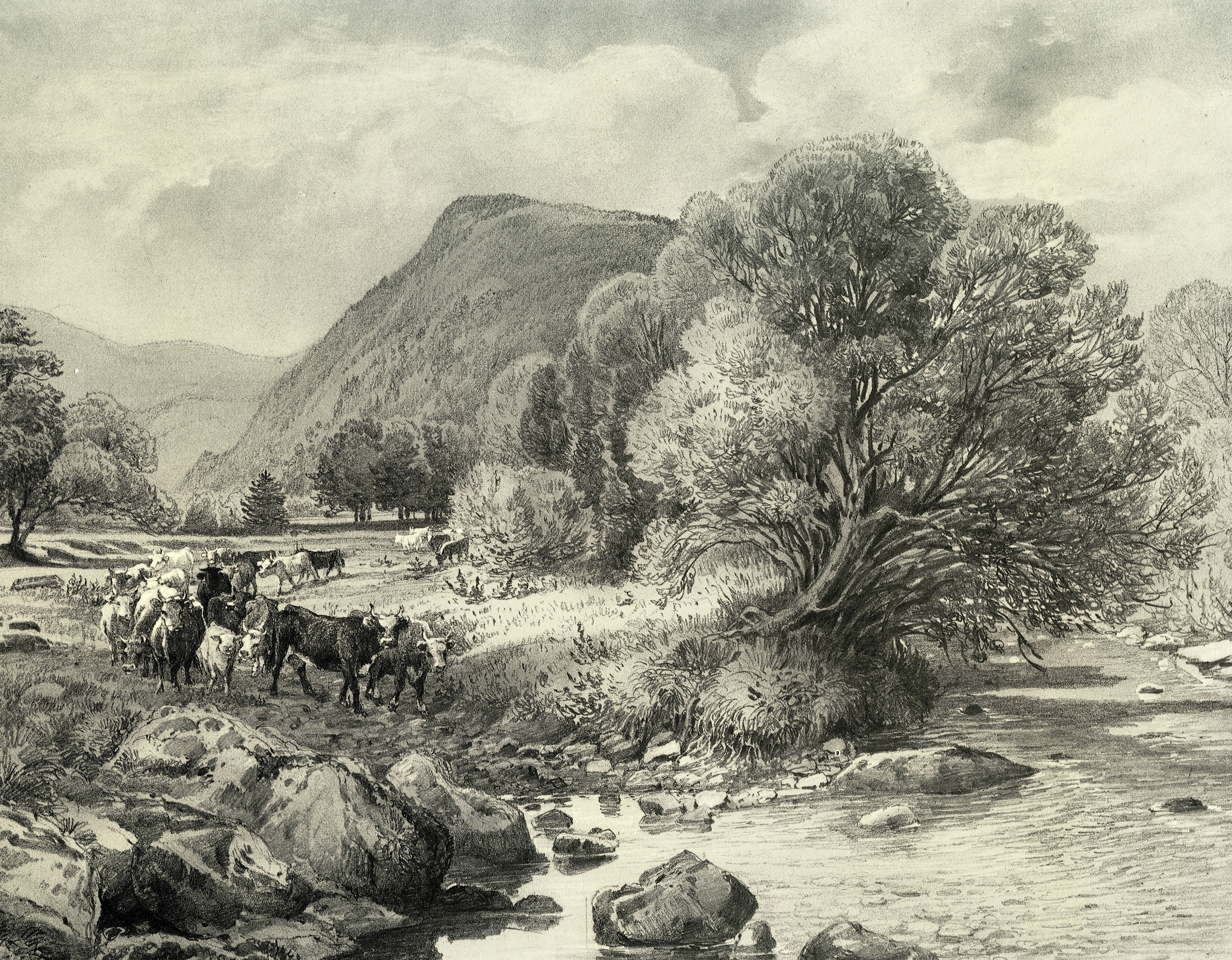
Surroundings of Schwechat - Bleistiftzeichnung von Gustav Schwartz von Mohrenstein - around 1850

Thus the new attack, launched on 28 October, was led by Móga. The two sides were roughly evenly matched on the battlefield, but the balance of power was only apparent. The bulk of Jelacic's army was made up of battle-hardened troops with years of experience. Half of the Hungarian troops deployed were people who never took a rifle in their hands, and many were armed with a scythe instead of a rifle. The Hungarian troops' right wing was supported by the war steamer "Mészáros", which sailed up the Danube.

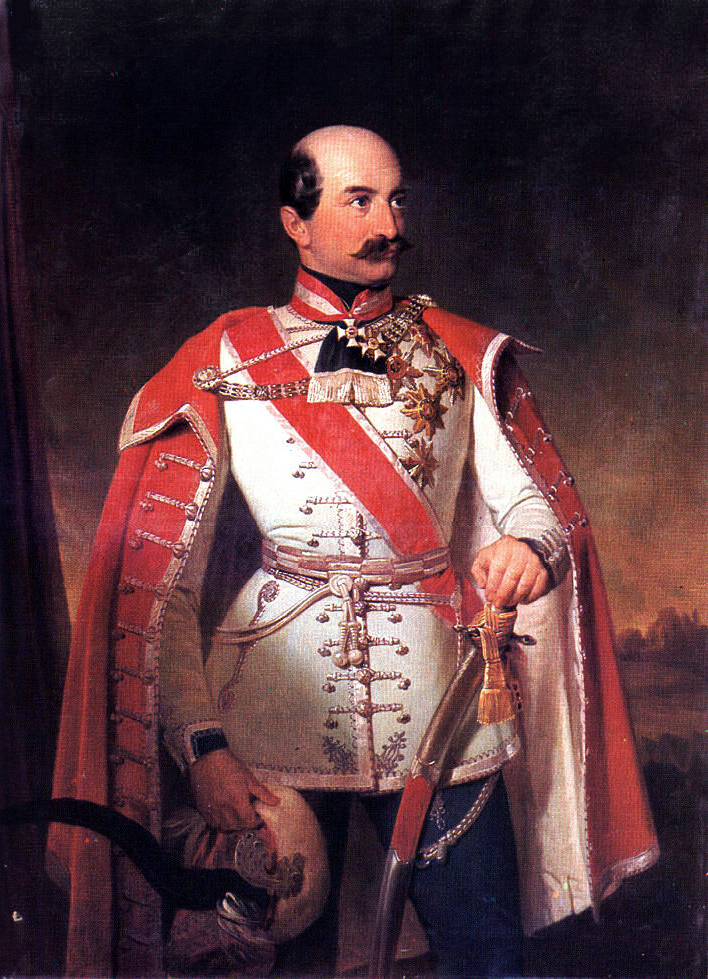
Ivan Zasche, Portret bana Josipa Jelacica

For Windisch-Grätz, the news of the Hungarian attack represented a serious dilemma. On 29 October, he held a council of war, at which Jelačić and most of the general staff officers were present. At the council of war, the general opinion was that the passes in front of Schwechat should be held defensively and on the right flank the combined Austrian cavalry should attack the Hungarian left flank. This plan was finally adopted.

On 28 October, the same day on which the Hungarians crossed the Lajta for the third time, Windisch-Grätz made his first heavy attack on Vienna; and it softened the Viennese defense that they were willing to negotiate with the besiegers. But just when the surrender was almost concluded, the news about the advance of the Hungarians, who came to the relief of Vienna, came to them, so the inhabitants of Vienna took up arms again and renewed the fight.

On 29 October, the army, with Görgei's brigade as the vanguard, but otherwise in the formation taken up the day before, crossed the Fischa River, and marched only a mile towards Schwechat, and took up their night rest in a slightly more concentrated position than the day before, on the heights north of Rauchenwarth, but were soon thoroughly disturbed by a false alarm. The general staff officer of the left wing, Captain Nemegyei, had sent a wrong report to the army headquarters that the left wing of the camp was already bypassed by the Austrian troops, so the Hungarian commanders sent reinforcements there during the night, although Nemegyei's mistake had been discovered in the meantime. This incident prevented the Hungarian army from properly resting on the night before the battle because many of the units had been kept on alert on the left wing all night instead of sleeping. At the same time, the rumors had a depressing effect on the morale of the troops.

Windisch-Grätz, informed of the Hungarian advance, pushed forward about 30-35,000 of the troops that had gathered around Vienna, and sent them with 54 guns under the command of Jelačić, to the Schwechat line, where the Ban of Croatia was to act as a defender at the beginning, while he continued to surround Vienna with the rest of the army. The bulk of Jelačić's army was deployed in and behind Schwechat; at the same time, he pushed a stronger column in front of his left flank to Mannswörth (then a village, today a part of Schwechat), while his right flank, consisting mainly of cavalry, was deployed between the Imperial Royal Paper Factory and Zwölfaxing. Jelačić secured his artificially fortified position through patrols.

=== Opposing forces ===
The Hungarian army
Commander Lieutenant General János Móga,
Chief of staff: Major Josef Kollmann

1. division. Commander: [Major General Franz Holtsche]

- 1. brigade. Commander: Colonel József Schweidel

- 20 infantry companies, 2 cavalry companies, 226 saddled horses, 66 traction horses, 6 cannons = 2639 soldiers;

- 2. brigade. Commander: Major Mór Kosztolányi

- 24 infantry companies, 89 traction horses, 4 cannons = 3550 soldiers;

- 3. brigade. Commander: Major Alois Wiedersperg

- 12 infantry companies, 2 cavalry companies, 143 saddled horses = 1415 soldiers;
Division total: 36 infantry companies, 4 cavalry companies, 369 saddled horses, 155 traction horses, 10 cannons = 7604 soldiers;

2. division. Commander: Colonel György Lázár

- 4. brigade. Commander: Major Miklós Kiss

- 30 infantry companies, 156 traction horses, 8 cannons = 5824 soldiers;

- 5. brigade. Commander: Major Lipót Zichy

- 11 infantry companies, 4½ cavalry companies, 465 saddled horses, 208 traction horses, 16 cannons = 2189 soldiers;
Division total: 41 infantry companies, 4½ cavalry companies, 365 saddled horses, 364 traction horses, 24 cannons = 8013 soldiers;

3. division. Commander: -

- 6. brigade. Commander: Lieutenant Colonel János Bárczay

- 22 infantry companies, 3 cavalry companies, 211 saddled horses, 86 traction horses, 14 cannons = 3737 soldiers;
Division total: 22 infantry companies, 3 cavalry companies, 211 saddled horses, 86 traction horses, 14 cannons = 3737 soldiers;

4. division. Commander: -

- 7. brigade. Commander: Colonel Artúr Görgei

- 24 infantry companies, 1½ cavalry companies, 135 saddled horses, 54 traction horses, 8 cannons = 3960 soldiers;
Division total: 24 infantry companies, 1½ cavalry companies, 135 saddled horses, 54 traction horses, 8 cannons = 3960 soldiers;

5. division. Commander: [Major General Ádám Teleki]

- 9. brigade. Commander: Colonel Mihály Répásy

- 6 infantry companies, 10 cavalry companies, 807 saddled horses, 174 traction horses, 20 cannons = 1721 soldiers;

- 10. brigade. Commander: Major Ferdinand Karger

- 14 infantry companies, 6 cavalry companies, 600 saddled horses, 79 traction horses, 6 cannons = 2620 soldiers;
Division total: 20 infantry companies, 16 cavalry companies, 1407 saddled horses, 253 traction horses, 26 cannons = 4431 soldiers;
Corps total: 163 infantry companies, 29 cavalry companies, 2487 saddled horses, 912 traction horses, 82 cannons = 27,655 soldiers;

Detached units (Did not participate in the battle):
- 12 infantry companies, 53 traction horses, 8 cannons = 2388 soldiers;
Army total: 175 infantry companies, 29 cavalry companies, 2487 saddled horses, 965 traction horses, 90 cannons = 30,043 soldiers;

Detailed order of battle of the Hungarian army

Division	Brigade	Unit	Infantry companies	Cavalry companies	Saddled horses	Traction horses	Cannons	Soldiers
1. Division; Commander: Major General Franz Holtsche; Chief of staff: Captain Ernő Szirányi
1. Division; Commander: Major General Franz Holtsche; Chief of staff: Captain Ernő Szirányi	1. brigade Colonel József Schweidel; Chief of staff: Captain Gábor Clementisz	1. battalion of the 34. (Prince of Prussia) Infantry Regiment; Major Vince Győzey	4	-	-	-	-	504
1. Division; Commander: Major General Franz Holtsche; Chief of staff: Captain Ernő Szirányi	1. brigade Colonel József Schweidel; Chief of staff: Captain Gábor Clementisz	2. battalion of the 34. (Prince of Prussia) Infantry Regiment; Major József Széll	6	-	-	-	-	756
1. Division; Commander: Major General Franz Holtsche; Chief of staff: Captain Ernő Szirányi	1. brigade Colonel József Schweidel; Chief of staff: Captain Gábor Clementisz	14. Honvéd Battalion; Major László Inczédy	6	-	-	-	-	517
1. Division; Commander: Major General Franz Holtsche; Chief of staff: Captain Ernő Szirányi	1. brigade Colonel József Schweidel; Chief of staff: Captain Gábor Clementisz	Zemplén County Battalion of the Volunteer Mobile National Guards; Major Gyula Andrássy	4	-	-	-	-	544
1. Division; Commander: Major General Franz Holtsche; Chief of staff: Captain Ernő Szirányi	1. brigade Colonel József Schweidel; Chief of staff: Captain Gábor Clementisz	4. (Alexander) Hussar Regiment; Major Ernő Poeltenberg	-	2	226	-	-	226
1. Division; Commander: Major General Franz Holtsche; Chief of staff: Captain Ernő Szirányi	1. brigade Colonel József Schweidel; Chief of staff: Captain Gábor Clementisz	4. K.u.K. six-pounder infantry battery Captain Karl Jungwirth	-	-	-	66	6	92
1. Division; Commander: Major General Franz Holtsche; Chief of staff: Captain Ernő Szirányi	1. brigade Colonel József Schweidel; Chief of staff: Captain Gábor Clementisz	Brigade total	20	2	226	66	6	2639
1. Division; Commander: Major General Franz Holtsche; Chief of staff: Captain Ernő Szirányi	2. brigade Major Mór Kosztolányi; Chief of staff: Captain Baldacci	1. (Veszprém) Battalion of the Volunteer Mobile National Guards; Major Géza Kun	6	-	-	-	-	875
1. Division; Commander: Major General Franz Holtsche; Chief of staff: Captain Ernő Szirányi	2. brigade Major Mór Kosztolányi; Chief of staff: Captain Baldacci	2. (Moson, Sopron, Győr and; Fejér) Battalion of the Volunteer Mobile National Guards; Major Manó Zichy	6	-	-	-	-	875
1. Division; Commander: Major General Franz Holtsche; Chief of staff: Captain Ernő Szirányi	2. brigade Major Mór Kosztolányi; Chief of staff: Captain Baldacci	3. (Tolna) Battalion of the Volunteer Mobile National Guards; Major Miklós Perczel	6	-	-	-	-	875
1. Division; Commander: Major General Franz Holtsche; Chief of staff: Captain Ernő Szirányi	2. brigade Major Mór Kosztolányi; Chief of staff: Captain Baldacci	4. (Somogy) Battalion of the Volunteer Mobile National Guards; Major Károly Tallián	6	-	-	-	-	875
1. Division; Commander: Major General Franz Holtsche; Chief of staff: Captain Ernő Szirányi	2. brigade Major Mór Kosztolányi; Chief of staff: Captain Baldacci	Kosztolányi's artillery Lieutenant Károly Malek	-	-	-	89	4	50
1. Division; Commander: Major General Franz Holtsche; Chief of staff: Captain Ernő Szirányi	2. brigade Major Mór Kosztolányi; Chief of staff: Captain Baldacci	Brigade total	24	-	-	89	4	3550
1. Division; Commander: Major General Franz Holtsche; Chief of staff: Captain Ernő Szirányi	3. brigade Major Alois Wiedersperg; Chief of staff: Captain Sándor Luzsénszky	1. Battalion of the 60. (Wasa) Infantry Regiment; Major Alois Wiedersperg	6	-	-	-	-	420
1. Division; Commander: Major General Franz Holtsche; Chief of staff: Captain Ernő Szirányi	3. brigade Major Alois Wiedersperg; Chief of staff: Captain Sándor Luzsénszky	Borsod County Battalion of the Volunteer Mobile National Guards; Major Lajos Vay	6	-	-	-	-	852
1. Division; Commander: Major General Franz Holtsche; Chief of staff: Captain Ernő Szirányi	3. brigade Major Alois Wiedersperg; Chief of staff: Captain Sándor Luzsénszky	9. (Nicholas) Hussar Regiment; ?	-	2	143	-	-	143
1. Division; Commander: Major General Franz Holtsche; Chief of staff: Captain Ernő Szirányi	3. brigade Major Alois Wiedersperg; Chief of staff: Captain Sándor Luzsénszky	Brigade total	12	2	143	-	-	1415
1. Division; Commander: Major General Franz Holtsche; Chief of staff: Captain Ernő Szirányi	Division total		56	4	369	155	10	7604
2. Division; Commander: Colonel György Lázár; Chief of staff: Captain Bódog Nemegyei
2. Division; Commander: Colonel György Lázár; Chief of staff: Captain Bódog Nemegyei	4. brigade Major Miklós Kiss; Chief of staff: Captain Alajos Bikkesy	23 Honvéd Battalion; Major György Kmety	6	-	-	-	-	961
2. Division; Commander: Colonel György Lázár; Chief of staff: Captain Bódog Nemegyei	4. brigade Major Miklós Kiss; Chief of staff: Captain Alajos Bikkesy	Komárom's County and urban National Guards 1. battalion Major János Csúzy	[6]	-	-	-	-	1500
2. Division; Commander: Colonel György Lázár; Chief of staff: Captain Bódog Nemegyei	4. brigade Major Miklós Kiss; Chief of staff: Captain Alajos Bikkesy	Volunteer Battalion of Pál Esterházy; Major Pál Esterházy	[6]	-	-	-	-	517
2. Division; Commander: Colonel György Lázár; Chief of staff: Captain Bódog Nemegyei	4. brigade Major Miklós Kiss; Chief of staff: Captain Alajos Bikkesy	Győr's County and urban National Guards Battalion; Major Ottó Zichy	[6]	-	-	-	-	1300
2. Division; Commander: Colonel György Lázár; Chief of staff: Captain Bódog Nemegyei	4. brigade Major Miklós Kiss; Chief of staff: Captain Alajos Bikkesy	Moson County National Guards Battalion ?	[6]	-	-	-	-	1000
2. Division; Commander: Colonel György Lázár; Chief of staff: Captain Bódog Nemegyei	4. brigade Major Miklós Kiss; Chief of staff: Captain Alajos Bikkesy	5. Honvéd six-pounder infantry battery Lieutenant Endre König	-	-	-	156	8	114
2. Division; Commander: Colonel György Lázár; Chief of staff: Captain Bódog Nemegyei	4. brigade Major Miklós Kiss; Chief of staff: Captain Alajos Bikkesy	Brigade total	30	-	-	156	8	5824
2. Division; Commander: Colonel György Lázár; Chief of staff: Captain Bódog Nemegyei	5. brigade Major Lipót Zichy; Chief of staff: Lieutenant Alfred Pusztelnik	1. Honvéd Battalion; Major Gyula Péterffy	6	-	-	-	-	753
2. Division; Commander: Colonel György Lázár; Chief of staff: Captain Bódog Nemegyei	5. brigade Major Lipót Zichy; Chief of staff: Lieutenant Alfred Pusztelnik	18. Honvéd Battalion; Major Alexander Buttler	6	-	-	-	-	901
2. Division; Commander: Colonel György Lázár; Chief of staff: Captain Bódog Nemegyei	5. brigade Major Lipót Zichy; Chief of staff: Lieutenant Alfred Pusztelnik	10. (Wilhelm) Hussar Regiment; Major Lipót Zichy	-	2½	225	-	-	225
2. Division; Commander: Colonel György Lázár; Chief of staff: Captain Bódog Nemegyei	5. brigade Major Lipót Zichy; Chief of staff: Lieutenant Alfred Pusztelnik	Mixed cavalry (Budapest horse national guards?)	-	2	140	-	-	140
2. Division; Commander: Colonel György Lázár; Chief of staff: Captain Bódog Nemegyei	5. brigade Major Lipót Zichy; Chief of staff: Lieutenant Alfred Pusztelnik	1. six-pounder Honvéd Cavalry Battery; Lieutenant László Adorján	-	-	-	52	8	56
2. Division; Commander: Colonel György Lázár; Chief of staff: Captain Bódog Nemegyei	5. brigade Major Lipót Zichy; Chief of staff: Lieutenant Alfred Pusztelnik	4. six-pounder Honvéd Cavalry Battery; Lieutenant József Faváry	-	-	-	156	8	114
2. Division; Commander: Colonel György Lázár; Chief of staff: Captain Bódog Nemegyei	5. brigade Major Lipót Zichy; Chief of staff: Lieutenant Alfred Pusztelnik	Brigade total	12	4½	365	208	16	2189
2. Division; Commander: Colonel György Lázár; Chief of staff: Captain Bódog Nemegyei	Division total		42	4½	365	364	24	8013
3. Division; Commander: -; Chief of staff: Captain Imre Szabó
3. Division; Commander: -; Chief of staff: Captain Imre Szabó	6. brigade Lieutenant Colonel János Bárczay; Chief of staff: Captain Oszkár Kleinheinz	2. (2. of Pest) Battalion of the Volunteer Mobile National Guards of Cisdanubia; Major Richard Guyon	6	-	-	-	-	875
3. Division; Commander: -; Chief of staff: Captain Imre Szabó	6. brigade Lieutenant Colonel János Bárczay; Chief of staff: Captain Oszkár Kleinheinz	1. Battalion of the 15. (2. Székely) Border Guard Regiment; Major Sámuel Szilágyi	6	-	-	-	-	758
3. Division; Commander: -; Chief of staff: Captain Imre Szabó	6. brigade Lieutenant Colonel János Bárczay; Chief of staff: Captain Oszkár Kleinheinz	Mixed Battalion of János Szász; Major János Szász	6	-	-	-	-	1067
3. Division; Commander: -; Chief of staff: Captain Imre Szabó	6. brigade Lieutenant Colonel János Bárczay; Chief of staff: Captain Oszkár Kleinheinz	Frangepán troop Captain Rudolf Beyer	1	-	-	-	-	292
3. Division; Commander: -; Chief of staff: Captain Imre Szabó	6. brigade Lieutenant Colonel János Bárczay; Chief of staff: Captain Oszkár Kleinheinz	Mixed battalion ?	[3]	-	-	-	-	350
3. Division; Commander: -; Chief of staff: Captain Imre Szabó	6. brigade Lieutenant Colonel János Bárczay; Chief of staff: Captain Oszkár Kleinheinz	12. (Nádor) Hussar Regiment; Captain Emil Üchritz	-	1	91	-	-	91
3. Division; Commander: -; Chief of staff: Captain Imre Szabó	6. brigade Lieutenant Colonel János Bárczay; Chief of staff: Captain Oszkár Kleinheinz	4. (Alexander) Hussar Regiment; Major Ernő Poeltenberg	-	2	120	-	-	120
3. Division; Commander: -; Chief of staff: Captain Imre Szabó	6. brigade Lieutenant Colonel János Bárczay; Chief of staff: Captain Oszkár Kleinheinz	1. Honvéd six-pounder ½ infantry battery Lieutenant Fülöp Gruber	-	-	-	51	4	61
3. Division; Commander: -; Chief of staff: Captain Imre Szabó	6. brigade Lieutenant Colonel János Bárczay; Chief of staff: Captain Oszkár Kleinheinz	Ivánka's battery First Lieutenant Ferenc Friwisz	-	-	-	18	4	54
3. Division; Commander: -; Chief of staff: Captain Imre Szabó	6. brigade Lieutenant Colonel János Bárczay; Chief of staff: Captain Oszkár Kleinheinz	Pozsony battery (no rank) Gustav Waagner	-	-	-	17	6	69
3. Division; Commander: -; Chief of staff: Captain Imre Szabó	6. brigade Lieutenant Colonel János Bárczay; Chief of staff: Captain Oszkár Kleinheinz	Brigade total	22	3	211	86	14	3737
3. Division; Commander: -; Chief of staff: Captain Imre Szabó	Division total		22	3	211	86	14	3737
4. Division; Commander: -; Chief of staff: -
4. Division; Commander: -; Chief of staff: -	7. brigade Colonel Artúr Görgei; Chief of staff: First Lieutenant Adolf Terzy	1. (1. of Pest) Battalion of the Volunteer Mobile National Guards of Cisdanubia; Major Lajos Gózon	6	-	-	-	-	875
4. Division; Commander: -; Chief of staff: -	7. brigade Colonel Artúr Görgei; Chief of staff: First Lieutenant Adolf Terzy	3. (Hont) Battalion of the Volunteer Mobile National Guards of Cisdanubia; Major Ignác (János) Heley	6	-	-	-	-	875
4. Division; Commander: -; Chief of staff: -	7. brigade Colonel Artúr Görgei; Chief of staff: First Lieutenant Adolf Terzy	4. (Nógrád) Battalion of the Volunteer Mobile National Guards of Cisdanubia; Major Pál Horváth	6	-	-	-	-	875
4. Division; Commander: -; Chief of staff: -	7. brigade Colonel Artúr Görgei; Chief of staff: First Lieutenant Adolf Terzy	Gömör County Volunteer Mobile National Guards Battalion; Major Pál horváth	6	-	-	-	-	1150
4. Division; Commander: -; Chief of staff: -	7. brigade Colonel Artúr Görgei; Chief of staff: First Lieutenant Adolf Terzy	10. (Wilhelm) Hussar Regiment; Major Károly Ábrahámy	-	1½	135	-	-	135
4. Division; Commander: -; Chief of staff: -	7. brigade Colonel Artúr Görgei; Chief of staff: First Lieutenant Adolf Terzy	3. six-pounder Honvéd Infantry Battery; Captain Bazil Sztrakoniczky	-	-	-	54	8	50
4. Division; Commander: -; Chief of staff: -	7. brigade Colonel Artúr Görgei; Chief of staff: First Lieutenant Adolf Terzy	Brigade total	24	1½	135	54	8	3960
4. Division; Commander: -; Chief of staff: -	Division total		24	1½	135	54	8	3960
5. Division; Commander: Major General Ádám Teleki; Chief of staff: Captain Heinrich Pusztelnik
5. Division; Commander: Major General Ádám Teleki; Chief of staff: Captain Heinrich Pusztelnik	9. brigade Colonel Mihály Répásy; Chief of staff: Captain Sándor Soupper	7. Honvéd Battalion; Major Karl Zinnern	6	-	-	-	-	710
5. Division; Commander: Major General Ádám Teleki; Chief of staff: Captain Heinrich Pusztelnik	9. brigade Colonel Mihály Répásy; Chief of staff: Captain Sándor Soupper	6. (Württemberg) Hussar Regiment; Major Ernő Poeltenberg	-	5	350	-	-	350
5. Division; Commander: Major General Ádám Teleki; Chief of staff: Captain Heinrich Pusztelnik	9. brigade Colonel Mihály Répásy; Chief of staff: Captain Sándor Soupper	9. (Nicholas) Hussar Regiment; ?	-	4	287	-	-	287
5. Division; Commander: Major General Ádám Teleki; Chief of staff: Captain Heinrich Pusztelnik	9. brigade Colonel Mihály Répásy; Chief of staff: Captain Sándor Soupper	13. (Hunyadi) Hussar Regiment; Major Alajos Sebő	-	1	170	-	-	170
5. Division; Commander: Major General Ádám Teleki; Chief of staff: Captain Heinrich Pusztelnik	9. brigade Colonel Mihály Répásy; Chief of staff: Captain Sándor Soupper	3. K.u.K. six-pounder cavalry battery Captain Franz Helm	-	-	-	38	6	55
5. Division; Commander: Major General Ádám Teleki; Chief of staff: Captain Heinrich Pusztelnik	9. brigade Colonel Mihály Répásy; Chief of staff: Captain Sándor Soupper	2. Honvéd six-pounder cavalry battery Major József Mack (?)	-	-	-	56	8	105
5. Division; Commander: Major General Ádám Teleki; Chief of staff: Captain Heinrich Pusztelnik	9. brigade Colonel Mihály Répásy; Chief of staff: Captain Sándor Soupper	1. twelve-pounder battery Lieutenant Imre Raksányi	-	-	-	80	6	49
5. Division; Commander: Major General Ádám Teleki; Chief of staff: Captain Heinrich Pusztelnik	9. brigade Colonel Mihály Répásy; Chief of staff: Captain Sándor Soupper	Brigade total	6	10	807	174	20	1721
5. Division; Commander: Major General Ádám Teleki; Chief of staff: Captain Heinrich Pusztelnik	10. brigade Major Ferdinand Karger; Chief of staff: Captain Vilmos Albrecht	3. Battalion of the 48. (Ernest) Infantry Regiment; Major András Simon	6	-	-	-	-	683
5. Division; Commander: Major General Ádám Teleki; Chief of staff: Captain Heinrich Pusztelnik	10. brigade Major Ferdinand Karger; Chief of staff: Captain Vilmos Albrecht	Grenadiers; Major Johann Weissel	2	-	-	-	-	311
5. Division; Commander: Major General Ádám Teleki; Chief of staff: Captain Heinrich Pusztelnik	10. brigade Major Ferdinand Karger; Chief of staff: Captain Vilmos Albrecht	Volunteer Mobile National Guards Battalion of the Hajdúság District; Major Bertalan Matkovich	6	-	-	-	-	992
5. Division; Commander: Major General Ádám Teleki; Chief of staff: Captain Heinrich Pusztelnik	10. brigade Major Ferdinand Karger; Chief of staff: Captain Vilmos Albrecht	4. (Alexander) Hussar Regiment; Major Ferdinand Karger	-	4	260	-	-	260
5. Division; Commander: Major General Ádám Teleki; Chief of staff: Captain Heinrich Pusztelnik	10. brigade Major Ferdinand Karger; Chief of staff: Captain Vilmos Albrecht	National Guard Cavalry of the Sopron and Moson Counties; Major Zsigmond Kovács	-	2	340	-	-	323
5. Division; Commander: Major General Ádám Teleki; Chief of staff: Captain Heinrich Pusztelnik	10. brigade Major Ferdinand Karger; Chief of staff: Captain Vilmos Albrecht	2. Twelve-pounder Battery; Lieutenant Ferenc Schmidt	-	-	-	79	6	51
5. Division; Commander: Major General Ádám Teleki; Chief of staff: Captain Heinrich Pusztelnik	10. brigade Major Ferdinand Karger; Chief of staff: Captain Vilmos Albrecht	Brigade total	14	6	600	79	6	2620
5. Division; Commander: Major General Ádám Teleki; Chief of staff: Captain Heinrich Pusztelnik	Division total		20	16	1407	253	26	4341
Corps total			164	29	2487	912	82	27,655
Detached units		Volunteer Mobile National Guards Battalion of the County and City of Komárom; Major Lipót Nádasdy	[6]	-	-	-	-	1500
Detached units		Budapest Battalion; Major Guidó Karátsonyi	6	-	-	-	-	820
Detached units		Mixed National Guard Battery of the Pest City; Captain József Petzelt	-	-	-	53	8	68
Total			12	-	-	53	8	2388
Army total			175	29	2487	965	90	30,043

The Imperial army
Commander Lieutenant General Josip Jelačić,
Chief of staff: Karl Ritter von Zeisberg

Hartlieb division

- Dietrich brigade: 3 infantry battalions, 1 cavalry company, 6 cannons;
- Kräutner brigade: 3 2/6 infantry battalions, 2 cavalry companies, 6 cannons;

Division total: 6 2/6 infantry battalions, 3 cavalry companies, 12 cannons;

Kempen division

- Neustädter brigade: 2 infantry battalions, 1 cavalry company, 6 cannons;
- Rastić brigade: 4 2/6 infantry battalions, 2 cavalry companies, 6 cannons;

Division total: 6 2/6 infantry battalions, 3 cavalry companies, 12 cannons;

Kriegern division

- Grammont brigade: 4 2/6 infantry battalions, 1 cavalry company, 6 cannons;
- Karger brigade: 4 2/6 infantry battalions, 6 cannons;

Division total: 8 4/6 infantry battalions, 1 cavalry company, 12 cannons;

Ottinger division

- Lederer brigade: 1 2/6 infantry battalions, 12 cavalry companies, 6 cannons;
- Baltheser brigade: 15 cavalry companies, 6 cannons;

Division total: 1 2/6 infantry battalions, 27 cavalry companies, 12 cannons;

Corps total: 22 4/6, 34 cavalry companies, 69 cannons;

Artillery reserve

- 21 cannons;

Assigned troops

- 8. Cuirassier regiment: 6 cavalry companies;
- 1. Uhlan regiment: 5 cavalry companies;
- Cavalry battery: 6 cannons;

Army total: 22 4/6 infantry battalions, 45 cavalry companies, 75 cannons;

The imperial army had around 33,000 soldiers.

=== Order of battle ===
The Hungarian army consisted of 21 battalions, 32 companies of cavalry, and 88 guns, and its personnel numbered about 20,000 infantry, 4,000 cavalry, and 2,000 artillery, i.e. 26,000 men in all, of whom only about 16,000 were regular troops, the rest being national guards. The 3000 or so infantrymen assigned to the reserve were armed only with scythes. On the morning of 30 October, the army resumed its offensive advance in the following order: The vanguard, consisting of 4 Honvéd battalions, 2 hussar companies, and 8 cannons, was led by Colonel Artúr Görgei, followed by the rest of the army, the main body, with the following formation:
- the right flank, under Colonel Miklós Bárczay: 6 battalions of infantry, 4 companies of cavalry, and 16 guns;
- the center, under Colonel Count György Kosztolányi: (Note: In the work of Bánlaky it is wrongly written that it was the "Lázár brigade". But György Lázár was leading the 2. division.) 4 Honvéd battalions, 6 companies of hussars, and 24 guns;
- the left wing, under Colonel Mihály Répássy: 4 battalions, 16 companies of hussars, and 24 guns;
- the Reserve, under Colonel Ferdinand Karger; 3 battalions of National Guards, 4 companies of Hussars, and 16 guns.

As for the position of the individual brigades in the battle order, the Hungarian right wing was formed by the 6th (Bárczay) Brigade. To the left of it stood the 2nd (Kosztolányi) Brigade, and to the left of it was the 7th (Görgei) Brigade, which temporarily formed the left wing, waiting until the end of the battle for the apparition of the brigade which was designed to be the left wing. The area between the Kosztolányi and Görgei Brigades was occupied later during the battle by the 1st (Schweidel) Brigade. The actual left wing was designed to be Colonel Mihály Répásy's 9th Brigade, although some sources claim that Major Lipót Zichy's 5th Brigade was deployed to the left of it. Miklós Kiss' 4th Brigade was deployed in the 2nd line of battle. According to some sources also the 3. (Wiedersperg) brigade was placed also in the second line, behind the 6. brigade. Karger's 10th Brigade was placed in reserve.

== Battle ==
The attack on 30 October took place on the Schwechat river line. Görgei formed the vanguard. On the morning of October 30, Bárczay's right flank column first came across the enemy in front of Mannswörth, and the battle began with a lively cannonade, then around 10 a.m., Major Richard Guyon with one of the Székely Battalions and the 2nd Pest Volunteer Battalion, breaking away from the other troops, resolutely went on the attack against the enemy occupying the outskirts of Mannswörth, and after a 20-minute battle he "majestically" took control over the village. Guyon also drove the enemy out of the mill there and from the farm buildings a little further away, where the enemy soldiers tried to hold. These buildings were set on fire by the Hungarians, together with the enemy soldiers caught in them. But this successful attack created a problem: the too-advanced Hungarian right wing formed an oblique line with the center and the left wing, thus te gallantly fighting Guyon's brigade on the right flank became completely isolated.

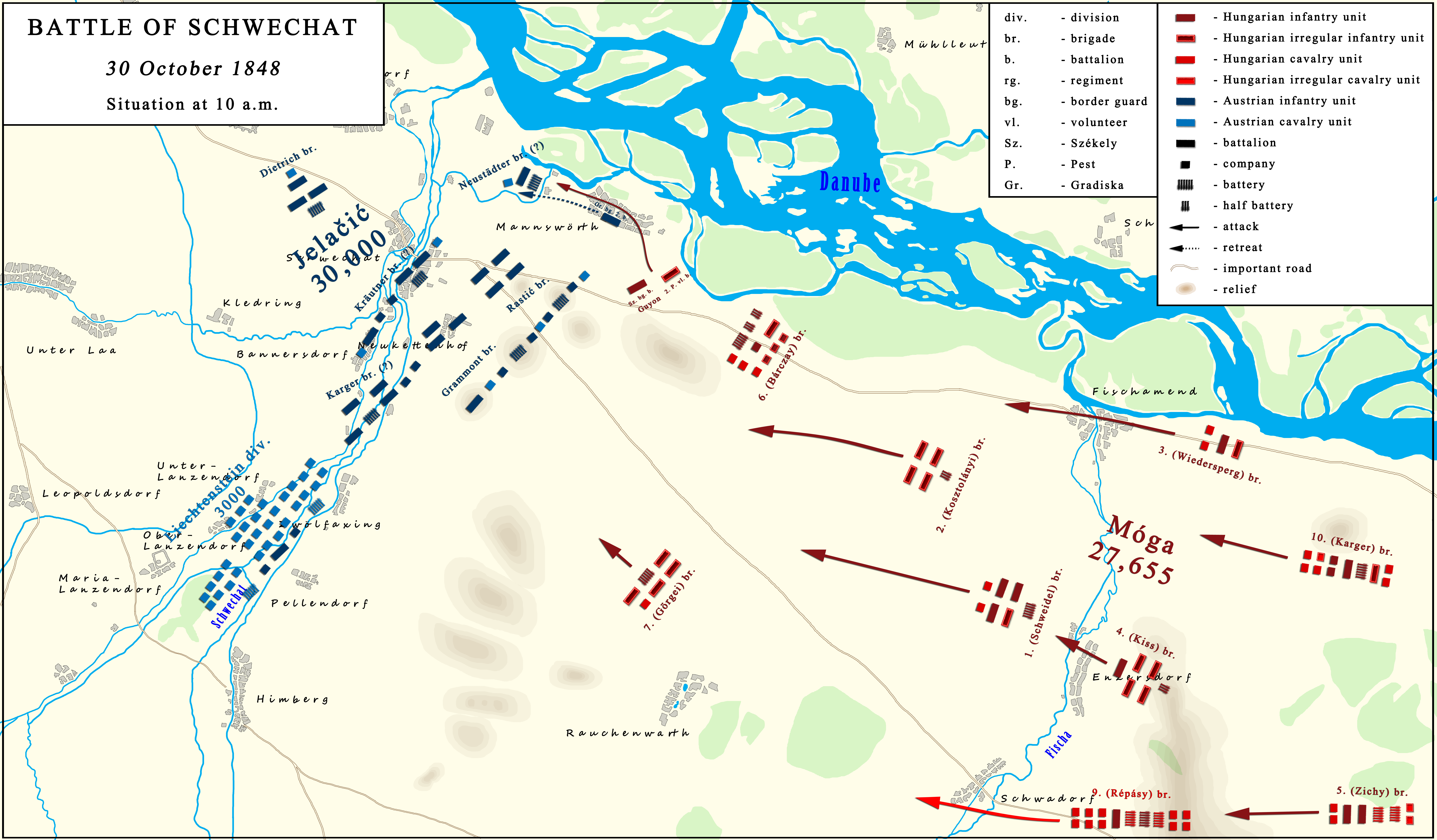
Battle of Schwechat. The situation at 10 a.m

At the same time as the attack on Mannswörth, Görgei received an order from Móga to wait for the brigades of the center. Before taking the order, the Colonel saw enemy lines appearing on the hills in front of Schwechat. He wanted to attack them, but Móga's order prevented this. So he waited for the arrival of the brigades of the Center. The Kosztolányi Brigade, which had arrived the first to the right of Görgei, deployed north of the Schwechat-Schwaadorf road, under the enemy's weak gunfire, to which Görgei put his guns to respond. (Note: In the work of Bánlaky it is wrongly written that it was the "Lázár brigade". But György Lázár was leading the 2. division. The center was represented by the Kosztolányi and the Schweidel brigades.) The Schweidel brigade, which had meanwhile arrived at noon, was deployed behind the Görgei and Kosztolányi brigades. (Note: In the work of Bánlaky it is wrongly written that it was the "reserve". The center was represented by the Kosztolányi and the Schweidel brigades.) After this happened, finally, Móga ordered Görgei to occupy the aforementioned hills, and as the enemy lines had retreated to Schwechat in the meantime, Görgei was able to carry out the order without further losses.

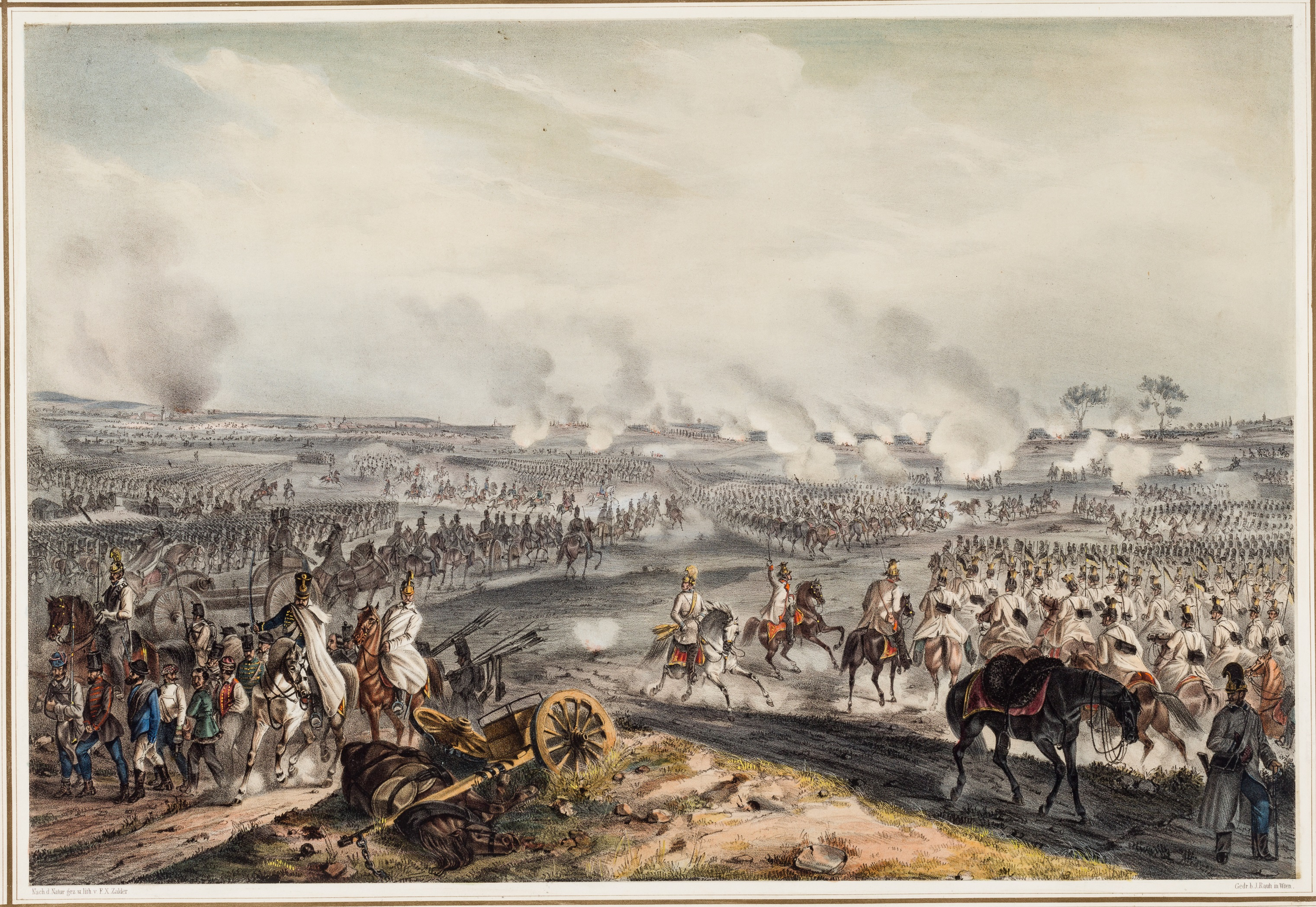
Battle of Schwechat on 30 October 1848 by Franz Xaver Zalder

Then, as the brigade next to him was hit by cannon fire from the northeast of the village, Görgei ordered his cannons to fire on Schwechat. Meanwhile, at Mannswörth, the hard fighting was still going on undecided, in which Guyon, with his two battalions, displayed a determination and courage close to recklessness. So for the time being, both the center and the Hungarian right wing were doing well enough, only the Répássy column, which was advancing too cautiously on the Rauchenwarth-Schwechat road, could not get on a level with them and join the battle. Répássy's advance was further delayed by the fact that Jelačić's right flank cavalry made an attacking movement from Zwölfaxing towards the Hungarian left flank, which forced Répássy's column to come to a complete halt, creating a huge gap between him and Görgei's left flank. Görgei was about to attack Schwechat when he was ordered by Móga to halt due to Répásy did not show yet on the left flank. Móga and Kollmann sent reinforcements to the Hungarian left wing because of Répásy's remaining behind. Görgei would have thought it more appropriate if Móga either ordered the left wing forward or pulled back the center and the right wing at least four gunshots distance from Schwechat. The idle waiting in front of Schwechat was only good for giving the enemy time and opportunity for a concentrated fire attack against the Hungarian troops on the open field.

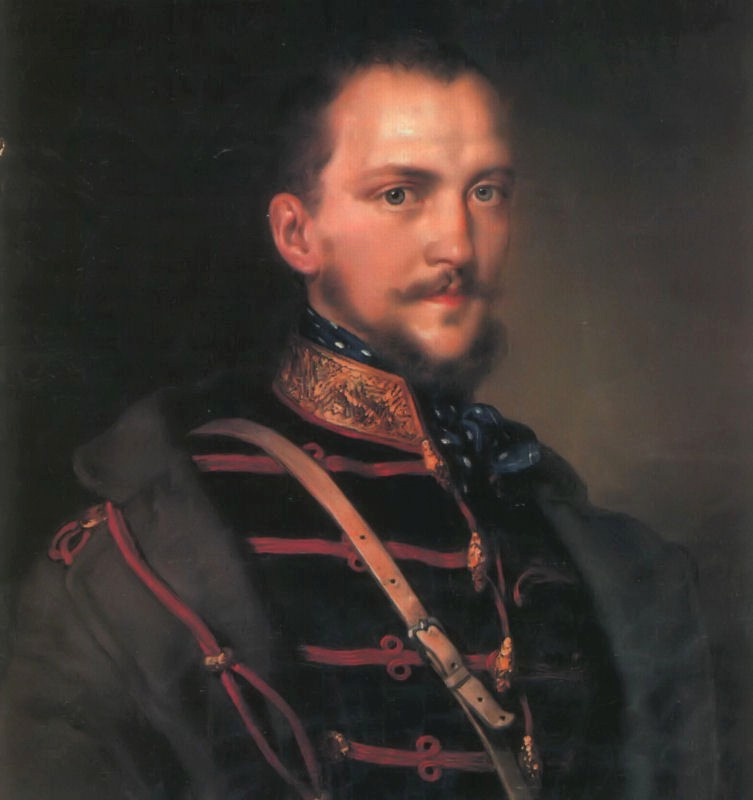
Artúr Görgey was promoted to General after his actions in the battle. He also became the leader of the army of the Upper Danube. (Painting by Miklós Barabás)

Görgei personally warned Moga about this, but the commander-in-chief rather rudely scolded the meddling colonel. Görgei then hurried back to his brigade, where on the left flank, where they waited for Répásy's troops, an enemy column of cavalry appeared. Görgei positioned his four battalions in the shape of a pick (hook) to defend against the encirclement; his cavalry was ordered to cover the half-battery left at the disposal of his brigade. His other four guns had already been requested by his general staff officer, Major Henrik Pusztelnik, to keep under fire the southeastern exit street of Schwechat. Otherwise, Jelačić, fortunately, did not think to counter this attack, but merely limited himself to passively maintaining the position he had occupied, sending from time to time reinforcements to his left flank, which was at Mannswörth and pressed by Guyon's daring bayonet attacks. On the center, around Schwechat, the Ban intended to use his artillery, and at noon he assembled several batteries on the hill west of the town.

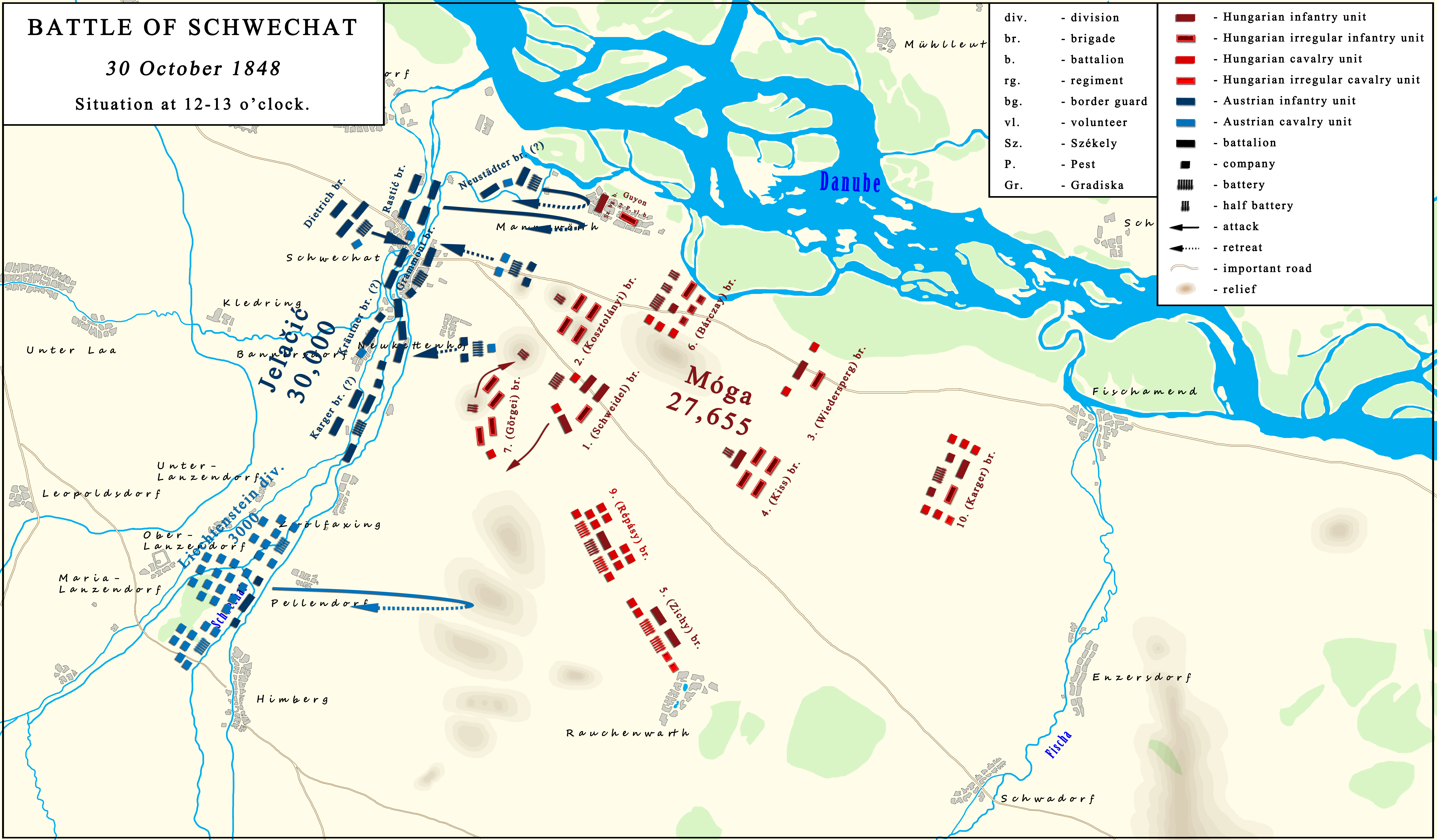
Battle of Schwechat. The situation between 12 - 13 o'clock

At about 2 p.m. Jelačić's Chief of Staff, Major General Zeisberg, tired of the inaction so far, launched an attack at Neukettenhof with a seven and a twelve-pounder battery. Major Pusztelnik, realizing the danger posed by this, also deployed several batteries against Schwechat, but they were soon overwhelmed by the more intense fire of the enemy and forced to abandon their positions. The Austrian guns threw the Kosztolányi brigade (Note: In the work of Bánlaky it is wrongly written that it was the "Lázár brigade". But György Lázár was leading the 2. division.) in the Hungarian center into disorder, which started to route. Exploiting this advantage, the enemy batteries moved to the hills east of Schwechat and immediately started firing first against the Hungarian center and then against the right flank column. As a result of the cannon fire, the Gömör and Hont volunteer mobile National Guard battalions forming Görgei's left flank wavered and then started to run away. Görgei then galloped to the 1st Pest Volunteer Mobile National Guard Battalion, because he believed that with them he could still attempt a charge against the imperial batteries which advanced a little bit too forward. However, this battalion soon followed the example of the Hont and Gömör battalions example (started routing).

Görgei could only trust the Nógrád Volunteer Battalion. He found the battalion in relatively good order, in a covered position; but as soon as it came within range of the enemy's guns, it followed the example of the others. Görgei had no choice but to retreat. To cover the retreat, he could only rely on the 1 ½ company of hussars in his brigade and the ½ battery led by Bazil Strakonitzky, or more precisely on the two guns of the latter still on the battlefield.

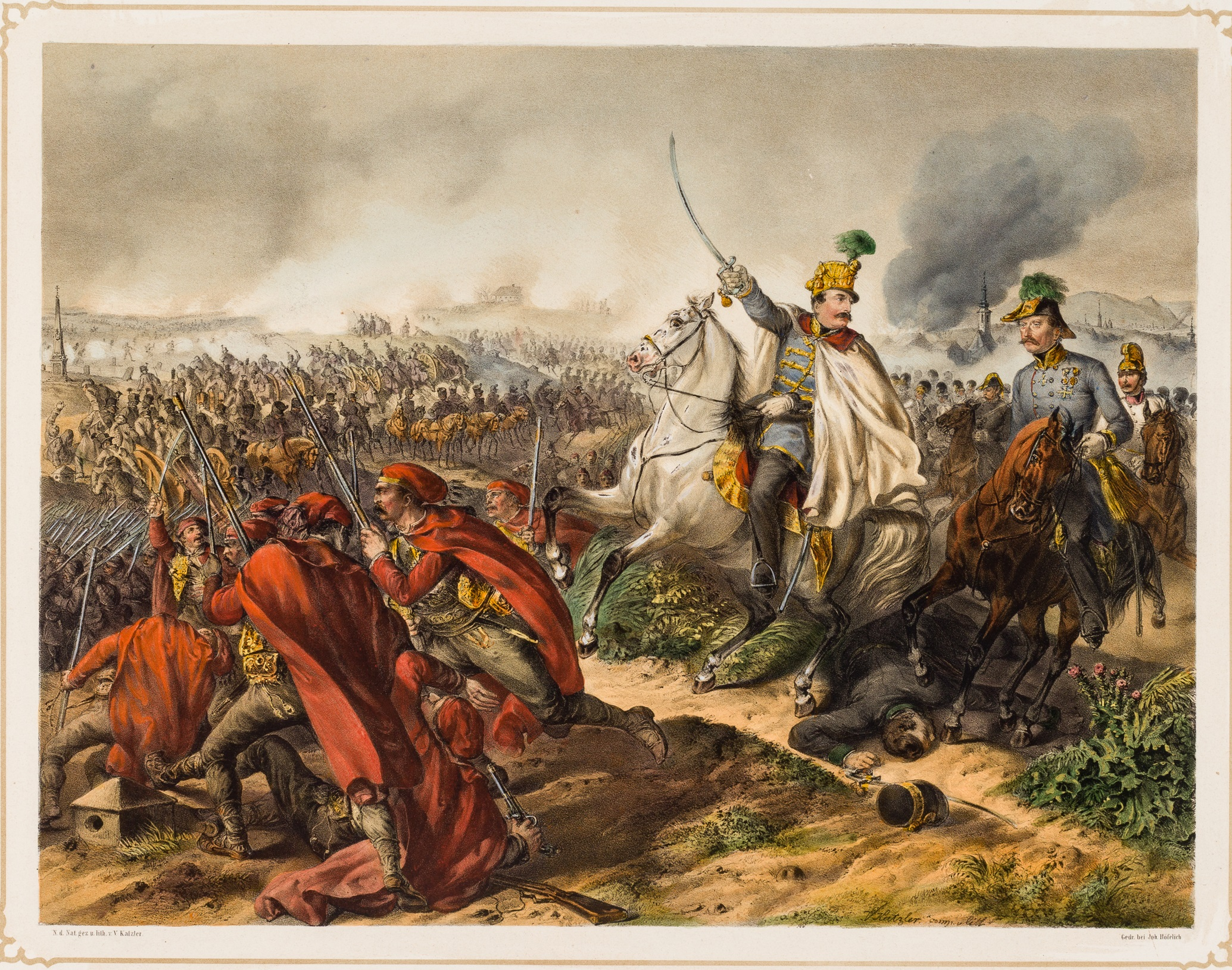
Jelacic in the Battle of Schwechat by Vinzenz Katzler

When at about 3 p.m. the K.u.K. army encircled and pushed back the left flank, which, because of Répásy's delaying, was formed by Görgei's brigade, Móga sent orders to the troops in the center to retreat. The troops from the front did this in good order. The cavalry covered the infantry's retreat, as the infantry retreated at a gallop or canter, in order to avoid of being captured by the enemy.

However, Lajos Kossuth still had hopes of victory. Encouraged by the successes so far, like the capture of Mannswörth and the rapid advance of the left wing led by Görgei, he believed that the attack should be continued, and therefore sent a courier to Görgei "to take command with the determination which had been lacking for weeks in the command of our army [referring at Móga and other K.u.K. officers]". Görgei, however, did not receive this order, and because of the retreat that had begun, there was little he could do.

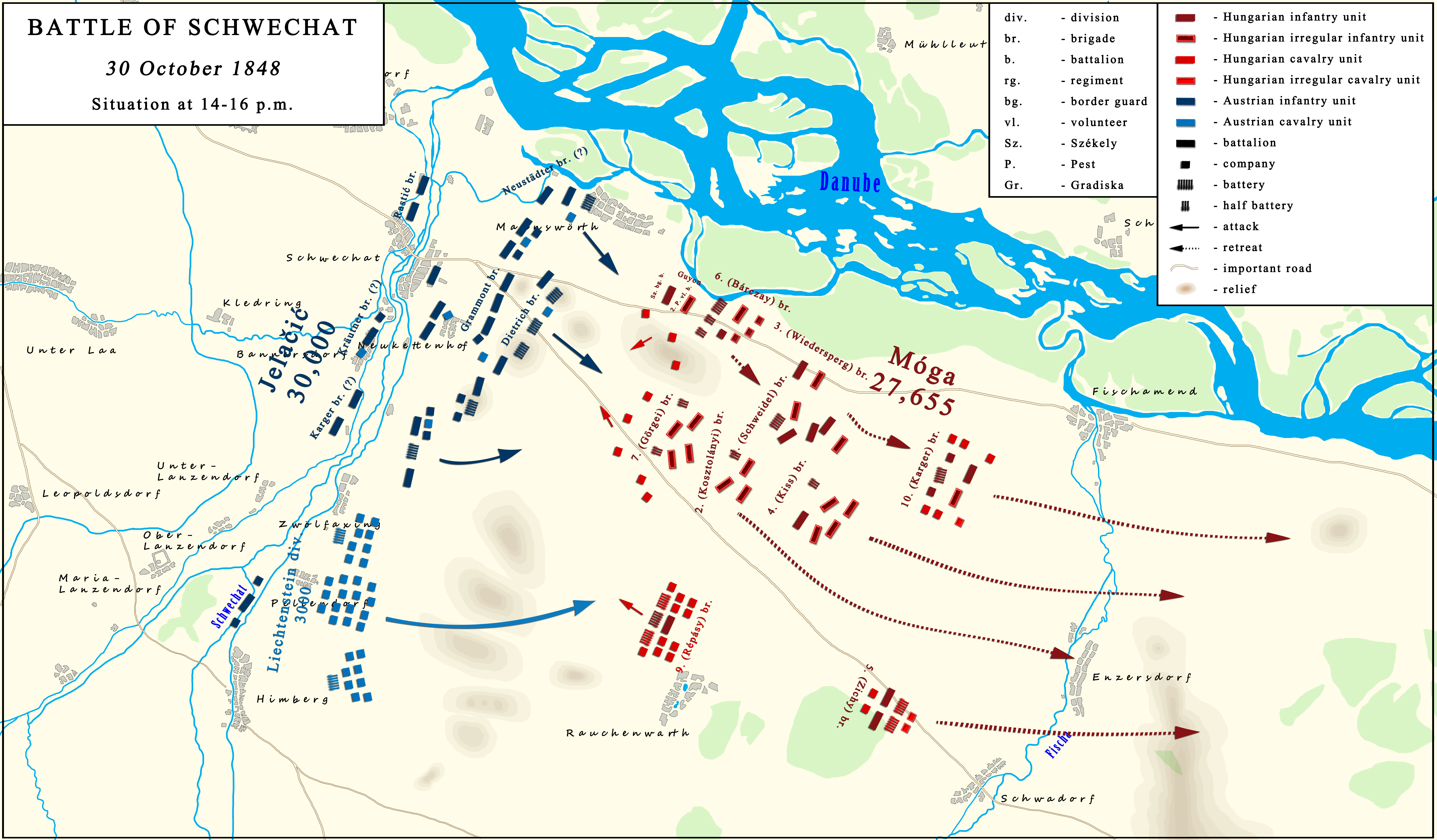
Battle of Schwechat. Situation between 14-16

The troops behind the front line of the center, a considerable part of which were militias and mobilized national guards, also sought refuge in disorderly retreat, partly because of the panic created by the routing Gömörians and partly because of the cannonballs that hit them. The 1st Battalion of the 34th (Prince of Prussia) Infantry Regiment disgraced itself among the line regiments with its cowardice. But the Hussars came up to the expectations. When the imperial infantry and cavalry assembled at Schwechat broke out from the town and tried to capture the Hungarian batteries, the Hussars repulsed them. Meanwhile, the gunners limbered (i.e. attach the gun to the two-wheeled "locomotive" used to change position), retreated, then stopped at a short distance and fired at the advancing enemy. In this way, the enemy was held up until the remaining infantry, retreating in order, could arrive in line with the guns.

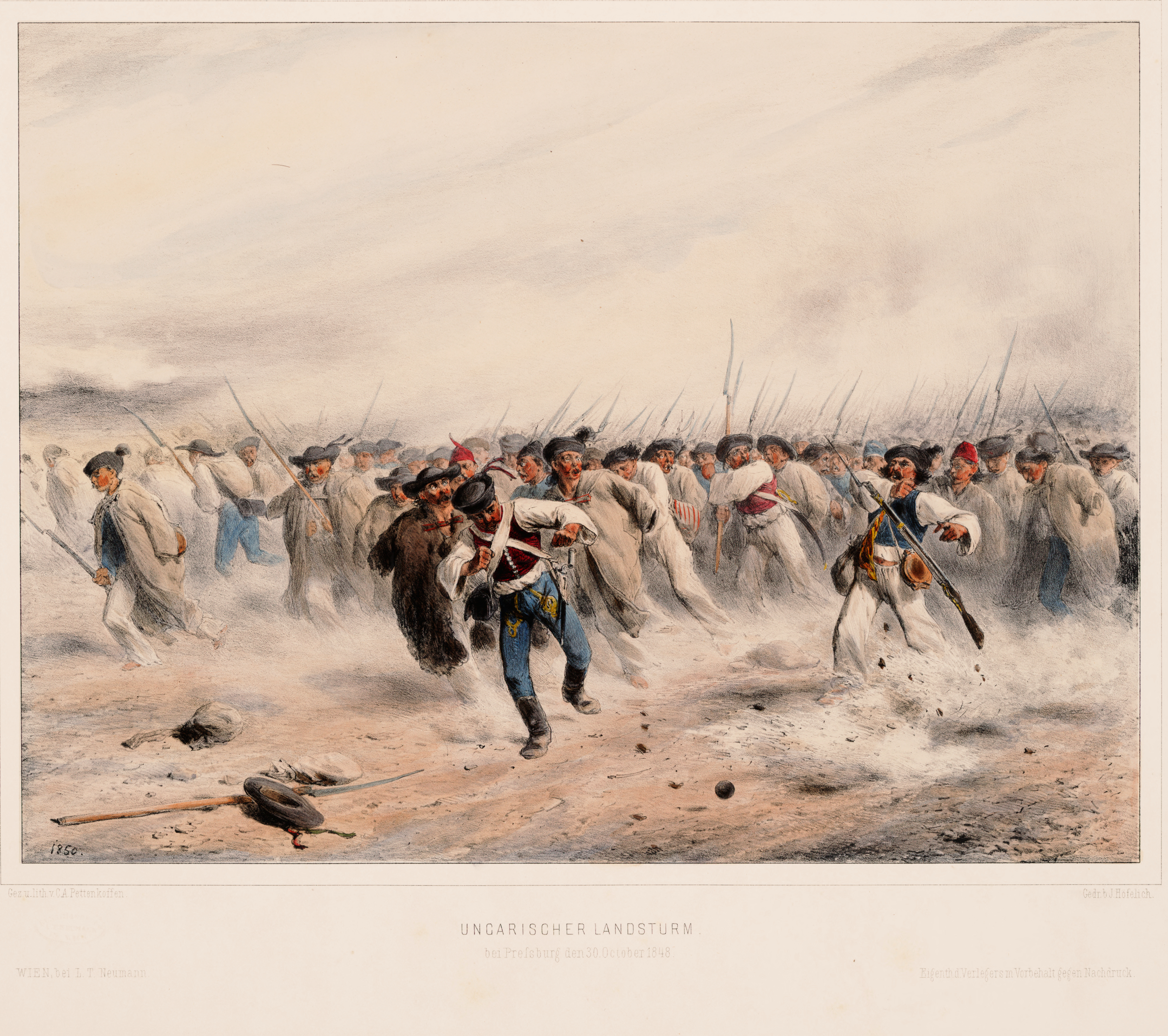
Routing Hungarian militias at Schwechat

The National Guards and volunteers, however, were so frightened by the rapid retreat that they thought all was lost, so they ran en masse. This fright then spread to the Honvéds, and the whole right flank was forced to retreat. Móga and Kollmann thought it best to withdraw the troops behind the Fischa. The troops could only be put back in order behind the Fischa creek.

The left flank brigade led by Mihály Répásy - which comprised a significant part of the cavalry - was, as we have seen, late in the advance. This time, however, the delay was fortunate for the Hungarian army. Jelačić's plan was to take the cavalry division led by Lieutenant General Franz Liechtenstein and attack the rear of the Hungarian troops who were pinned down on the Schwechat line.

Répásy arrived on the battlefield with his hussar squadrons and cavalry batteries just as the united Imperial Cavalry led by Lieutenant General Liechtenstein was about to begin to encircle the Hungarian center and push it towards the Danube. However, due to the arrival of Répásy and the excellent performance of his cavalry artillery, Liechtenstein did not dare to order the attack, so the Hungarian troops, who had meanwhile retreated, reached the Hungarian borders without serious pursuit and significant losses. The conduct of Répásy's troops during the retreat also earned Windisch-Grätz's praise: This is not a ragtag band of rebels. This is an army! he said.

== Aftermath ==
Despite the rather long duration of the battle - from 7 a.m. to 3 p.m. - the infantry did little of note during it, except for Guyon's two battalions, but they fought more with the bayonets, and not with the rifles. Besides, the battle of Schwechat consisted of little more than a slow, unimportant cannonade, and on the imperial side, a few successful threatening moves done by the cavalry. As a result of this, the number of casualties was not very high. About the Hungarian losses, there are very differing numbers: According to Lajos Kossuth there were 40 dead and 200 wounded, László Újházy government commissioner said that there were in total 200 casualties, according to Captain Lajos Árkossy 400-500, according to Captain Emil Üchritz 800 people and 50 horses. However the casualty numbers given by particular brigades about their own losses, suggest higher losses for the entire army, than the above-mentioned numbers. For example, the Guyon brigade lost 207 soldiers during its fight for Mannswörth, while the Kosztolányi brigade reported 23 deaths, 18 wounded and 654 disappeared or captured soldiers, in total 695 men lost. The Austrian losses were much lower. Jelačić's corps lost 17 dead, 51 wounded, and 8 missing soldiers, 1 dead and one wounded horse. The Liechtenstein division lost 5 dead, 8/11 wounded, 4 missing soldiers, 34/37 dead, and 8/9 wounded horses. Thus the Austrian losses were in total 22 dead, 59/62 wounded, 8/12 missing soldiers, 35/38 dead and 9/10 wounded horses.

During the battle, Móga fell from his horse and was seriously wounded, as a result of which he resigned his command and Artur Görgei took command of the Hungarian troops.

At the time of the campaign to relieve Vienna, it was already known that on 21 October, Lieutenant-General Balthasar von Simunich, with a strong brigade of 5,000 men, had entered Trencsén County from Moravia through the Jablunka Pass. This force defeated the Hungarian army, led by Major Kálmán Ordódy and consisting mostly of National Guards, at Kostolna on 28 October. It soon captured Nagyszombat and threatened Pozsony. Ordódy's troops retreated towards Lipótvár.

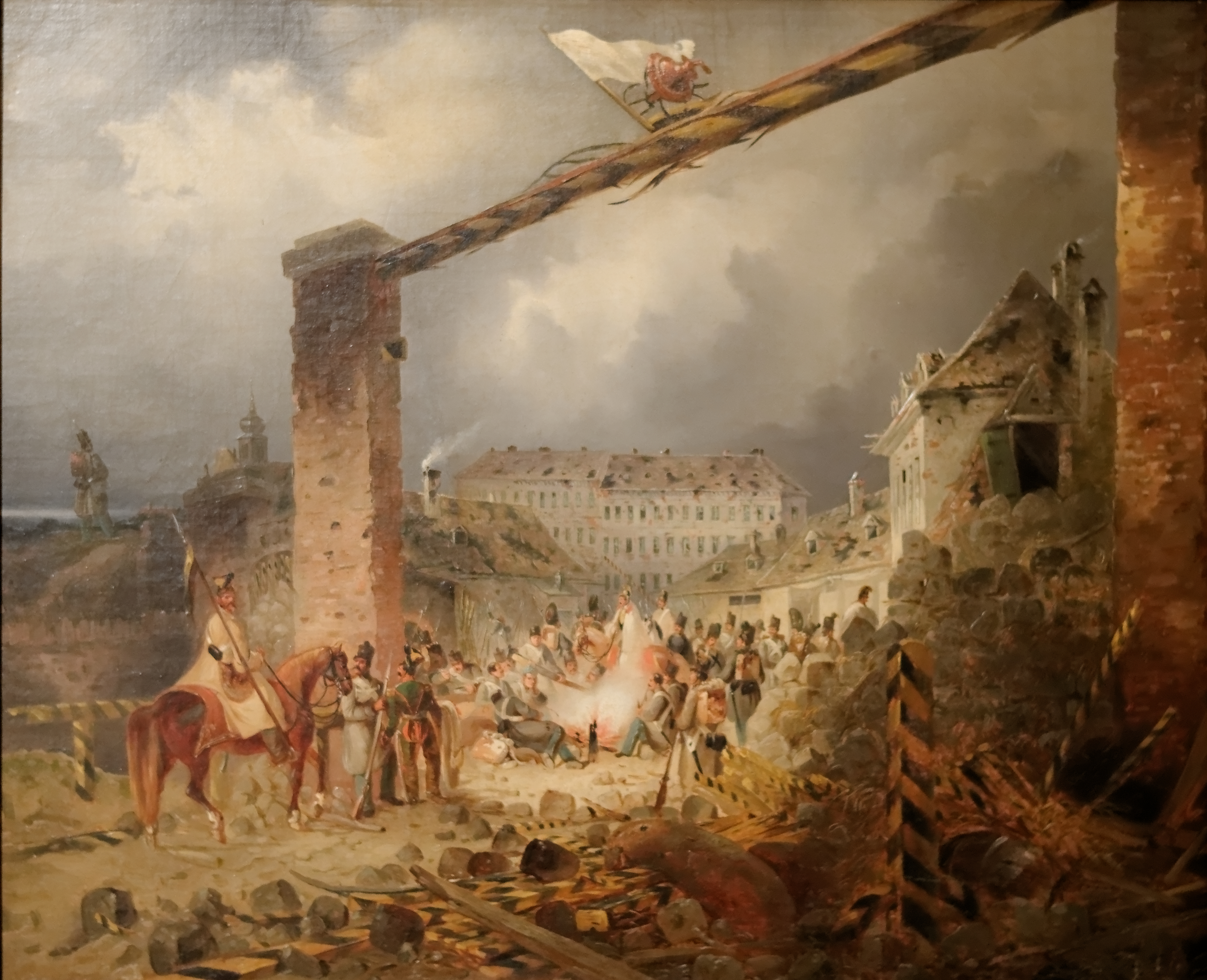
The Austrian imperial army conquers Vienna

After the Battle of Schwechat, Kossuth arranged for 8,000 troops, commanded by Colonel Richard Guyon, to enter Köpcsény with 22 guns to capture Simunich's army. With reinforcements received in Pozsony, this force which now reached 10,000 men and 32 guns pursued Simunich. The plan was to block Simunich's way of withdrawal with the national guards of the Felvidék counties and Ordódy's troops, thus forcing him to surrender. But Guyon's troops were so tired that they could not be moved without resting. The Hungarian local forces, fearing Simunich's superior troops, did not even attempt to block the Lieutenant General's path. Finally Guyon departed with his troops to pursue the enemy and his vanguard first caught up with the enemy at Nádas on 3 November, and the hussars cut down the enemy rearguard left behind. The next day, on 4 November, a rearguard action took place at Jablonic. Guyon's soldiers, however, were unable to inflict any serious damage on Simunich's rapidly retreating troops. His troops returned to the eastern side of the Little Carpathians and took up a position at Nádas.

The Battle of Schwechat proved that temporarily mobilized national guards and popular insurgents, militias, and untrained volunteers, are not enough to defeat the enemy's regular forces. What was enough against Jelačić and Roth at Pákozd and Ozora was not enough against Jelačić's regular army at Schwechat. It also turned out that the army should only be led by officers who were willing to shoot at their former comrades without hesitation, not only if they wore the uniform of the "rebel" Croatian border guards, but also if they wore the white coat of the K.u.K. regiments.

The relief of Vienna from the imperial siege was an illusory ambition at that time: Schwechat did not turn into a military disaster, as the conduct of some of the troops and the enemy's mistakes allowed the Hungarian army to reach the Lajta river relatively intact. From a politico-military point of view, the campaign was a success for the Hungarians, since it was the beginning of a purification process that put into leading positions the officers who were committed to the defense of Hungary against any enemy.

The imperial army seemed to have won a victory, as it repulsed the Hungarian attack, and in the following days captured Vienna. But Windisch-Grätz missed the calculation. By contenting himself with repulsing the Hungarian army and turning the bulk of his forces against Vienna during the battle, he allowed the Hungarian army to maintain its fighting strength despite the defeat. And after the Prince spent the next few weeks pacifying Vienna, the fighting capacity of the Hungarians only increased. Windisch-Grätz did not realize that Vienna would not run away, that is, that he would have the opportunity to put down the revolution completely, even after he had completely destroyed the Hungarian army.

== Sources ==
- Rady, Martyn (2023). Габсбурги власть над миром [The Habsburgs: To Rule the World'] (in Russian). Перевод с Английского–М., Альпина-Нон-Фикшн. ISBN 978-5-00139-266-8.
- Bánlaky, József (2001). A magyar nemzet hadtörténelme (The Military History of the Hungarian Nation) (in Hungarian). Budapest: Arcanum Adatbázis.
- Gelich, Richárd (1883). Magyarország függetlenségi harcza 1848-49-ben ("The War of Independence of Hungary in 1848-49, vol. 1) (in Hungarian). Pest: Aigner Lajos.
- Hermann, Róbert (2011), "A magyar hadsereg a schwechati csatában – egy harcrend tanulságai. A hadrendek és harcrendek történeti forrásértékéről ("The Hungarian Army in the Battle of Schwechat - Lessons Learned from an Order of an Order of Battle. About the Source Value of the Force Structures and Orders of Battle")" (PDF), Aetas 2011 (volume 26, nr. 1) (in Hungarian)
- Hermann, Róbert (2004), Az 1848–1849-es szabadságharc nagy csatái ("Great Battles of the Hungarian Revolution of 1848 – 1849") (in Hungarian), Zrínyi, ISBN 963-327-367-6
- Hermann, Róbert (2008), "Az eldöntő döntetlen. A schwechati csata 1848. október 30-án ("The Decisive Draw. The Battle of Schwechat, 30 October 1848")", A Drávától a Lajtáig. Tanulmányok az 1848. nyári és őszi dunántúli hadi események történetéhez ("From the River Dráva to the River Lajta. Studies on the summer and autumn military events of 1848") (in Hungarian), Balassi, ISBN 978-963-506-758-9
- Hermann, Róbert (2013). Nagy csaták. 15. A magyar önvédelmi háború ("Great Battles. 15. The Hungarian War od Self Defense") (in Hungarian). Budapest: Duna Könyvklub. p. 88. ISBN 978-615-5013-99-7.
- Ervin Liptai, ed. (1985), Magyarország hadtörténete két kötetben ("Hungarian Military History in Two Volumes") (in Hungarian), Zrínyi Katonai (Zrínyi Military), ISBN 963-326-337-9
- Pusztaszeri, László (1984), Görgey Artúr a szabadságharcban ("Artúr Görgey in the Hungarian Revolution of 1848") (in Hungarian), Magvető, ISBN 963-14-0194-4
- Kedves, Gyula; Zachar, József; Zachar, Péter Krisztián (1999), 1848/49-ről százötven év távlatából ("1848-49 Seen 150 years Thence") (in Hungarian), Siklósi Vár és Múzeumbaráti Kör (Friends of Siklós Castle and Museum), ISBN 963-03-9298-4
- Rüstow, Friedrich Wilhelm (1866). Az 1848-1849-diki magyar hadjárat története, II. kötet ("The History of the Hungarian Campaign from 1848-1849, vol. 2.) (in Hungarian). Pest: Emich Gusztáv.
