= József Irinyi =

Hungarian writer, translator, politician (1822–1859)

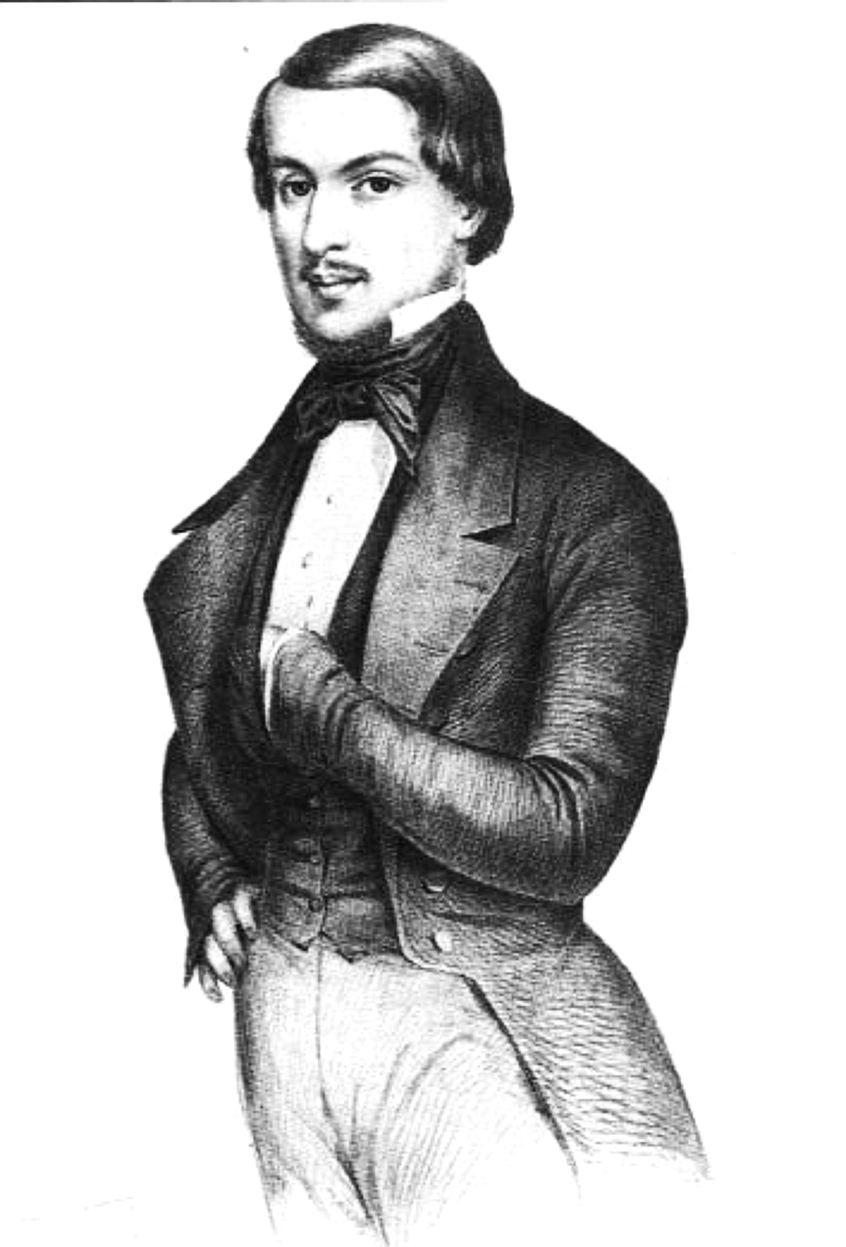

Member of the National Assembly
- In office 6 July 1848 – 13 August 1849

Personal details
- Born: József Irimi (or Iosif Irimie); 13 March 1822 Albiș, Austrian Empire
- Died: 20 February 1859 (aged 36) Pest, Kingdom of Hungary
- Resting place: Kerepesi Cemetery
- Party: Radical Party
- Relatives: János Irinyi (brother); Iosif Vulcan (nephew); Emanoil Gojdu (father-in-law)
- Writing career
- Language: Hungarian
- Years active: 1842–1859
- Education: Academy of Law in Oradea; Reformed College of Debrecen
- Occupation: Journalist, publicist, writer, translator, politician
- Known for: Drafting the 12 Points of 1848; Translating Uncle Tom's Cabin into Hungarian

József Irinyi (Note: Hungarian pronunciation: [ˈjoːʒɛf ˈiriɲi]) (in Romanian: Iosif Irimie; 13 March 1822 – 20 February 1859) was a Hungarian publicist, writer, translator, and politician of Romanian descent. He was the younger brother of chemist and inventor János Irinyi. A prominent intellectual of the radical youth during the Hungarian Revolution of 1848 and one of the movement's chief theoreticians, Irinyi was the initiator and primary drafter of the 12 Points presented in Pest in March 1848. He later served as a diplomat representing the Hungarian revolutionary government in the French Second Republic and as a member of the revolutionary parliament in Debrecen and Szeged.

== Early life and family ==
Irinyi was born in Albiș, Bihar County (now in Bihor County, Romania), into a family of petty landowning nobility. He was the son of agronomist János Irinyi and Roxanda Janovits (also known as Róza Jánossy, of Aromanian descent). The family originated from an Eastern Orthodox Romanian background; civil registers and parish records in Diosig recorded the family surname under the variants Irimi or Irimie before the adoption of the Magyarized form Irinyi.

At birth, he was baptized into the Romanian Orthodox Church in Diosig as József (Iosif) Irimi, registered under the canonical Latin designation Graeci ritus non unitus ("of non-united Greek rite"). His siblings, János and Antónia, were recorded under the same confessional status in parish registries and early schooling records. In adulthood, members of the family, including József and János, converted to the Reformed (Calvinist) faith. The family's earlier use of the patronymic Irimie was corroborated in the 20th-century correspondence of his descendants. After their conversion to Calvinism, the family claimed to be related to an old Hungarian noble family, Irinyi de Iriny, also from Bihar County. However, in 1841, a member of the later family, Tamás Irinyi de Iriny, filed an official complaint against János' use of his coat-of-arms.

The family had extensive connections to the Romanian national and cultural movements in Transylvania and Crișana. His sister, Viktória Irinyi, married Greek Catholic priest Nicolae Vulcan, becoming the mother of publicist and editor Iosif Vulcan, the founder of the literary magazine Familia, while another sister, Heléna (Lilla) Irinyi, married jurist Ioan Gozman (Gozmán János), a parliamentary deputy for Bihar County and a prominent lay figure in the Romanian Orthodox Church, who in 1849 participated in political mediation efforts between the Hungarian revolutionary government and Romanian insurgents in the Apuseni Mountains. Jurist and philanthropist Emanoil Gojdu was a brother-in-law of Irinyi's father.

Despite his Romanian heritage, Irinyi was raised and educated entirely within Hungarian cultural circles, published exclusively in the Hungarian language, and identified as an exponent of Hungarian political liberalism, remaining uninvolved in Romanian national organizations.

== Education and early career ==
Irinyi completed his secondary and higher education at the Academy of Law in Oradea (Nagyvárad), before entering the Reformed College of Debrecen in 1838. After concluding his legal education and completing a mandatory year of legal clerkship, he relocated to Pest to sit for the bar examination, which he passed in 1843 in Pozsony (Bratislava) during a session of the Hungarian Diet.

In Pest, Irinyi entered prominent literary circles, establishing working relationships with figures such as Ferenc Toldy, József Bajza, and Mihály Vörösmarty. He became a contributor to the journal Athenaeum and chose to pursue journalism and literature rather than legal practice.

In 1842, Irinyi embarked on a tour of Western Europe, visiting the German Confederation, France, and Great Britain (spending extended time in London). Following his return in 1843, his travel memoirs were initially suppressed by imperial Habsburg censors. They were subsequently published in two volumes in 1846 in Halle under the title Német-, franczia-, és angolországi Uti jegyzetek ("Travel Notes from Germany, France, and England"), which became a notable work of Hungarian Reform Era travel literature.

Between 1844 and 1848, Irinyi served as the foreign policy editor of the liberal daily Pesti Hírlap. During this period, he also wrote theatre criticism and literary essays for Életképek. A polemical figure, he fought two duels prior to 1848, including one with an editor of the conservative newspaper Budapesti Híradó.

== Revolution of 1848–1849 ==
=== The March movement and the 12 Points ===
With the outbreak of revolutionary movements across Europe in March 1848, Irinyi became part of the core group of radical young intellectuals in Pest, known as the "March Youth" (márciusi ifjak). He served as a member of the delegation dispatched to the royal Vice-Regal Council to demand the abolition of censorship and the release of political prisoners, including writer Mihály Táncsics.

Irinyi proposed organizing the disparate demands of the youth and reformist opposition into a concise programmatic manifesto, serving as the primary author and editor of the 12 Points. The document demanded freedom of the press, an executive government responsible to parliament, annual legislative sessions, equality before the law, the creation of a national guard, the abolition of serfdom and tax exemptions for nobles, and the political union of Transylvania with Hungary.

In the spring of 1848, Irinyi - alongside Sándor Petőfi, Pál Vasvári, and Dániel Irányi - advocated for the release from prison of Eftimie Murgu, the democratic leader of the Romanian movement in the Banat.

=== Parliamentary and diplomatic service ===
Prior to the opening of the newly elected National Assembly of 1848, Irinyi sat on the committee tasked with drafting the rules of procedure for the House of Representatives, working alongside Zsigmond Kemény, Gábor Lónyay, Samu Bónis, and Antal Csengery. He was subsequently elected as a deputy to the assembly representing Bihor County.

On 8 October 1848, the Hungarian revolutionary government appointed Irinyi as legation counselor in Paris. In this capacity, he carried out diplomatic duties aimed at securing formal recognition and support for the Hungarian revolutionary state from the French Second Republic.

Following the Hungarian Declaration of Independence and the dethronement of the House of Habsburg on 14 April 1849 in Debrecen, Irinyi re-entered the country using a forged passport and resumed his seat in the Diet. On 28 July 1849, during the parliamentary session convened in Szeged, he voted in favor of the revolutionary Nationalities Law, which formally granted linguistic and cultural rights to non-Hungarian nationalities in municipal administration, education, and church affairs.

== Later life and death ==
Following the surrender of the Hungarian army at Világos in August 1849, Irinyi attempted to escape abroad, but was arrested by Austrian authorities in Graz. He was transferred to Pest and incarcerated in the military prison at the Újépület ("New Building"). A military court convicted him of treason and sentenced him to death by hanging; however, he was subsequently pardoned by Austrian military governor Julius Jacob von Haynau.

After his release, Irinyi withdrew from political activism and focused on belletristic writing and translation. Throughout the 1850s, he contributed cultural and literary pieces to periodicals such as Pesti Napló and Magyar Sajtó. During this period, he produced the first Hungarian translation of Harriet Beecher Stowe's abolitionist novel Uncle Tom's Cabin (Tamás bátya kunyhója), along with its supplementary work, A Key to Uncle Tom's Cabin (Kulcs Tamás bátya kunyhójához). He also translated Alexandre Dumas fils's play The Lady of the Camellias into Hungarian.

In 1858, he was appointed honorary chief notary of the Dunamellék Reformed Church District.

Irinyi died of a heart condition in Pest on 20 February 1859, at the age of 36. He was buried two days later in Kerepesi Cemetery in a Reformed service. His obituary was published in Vasárnapi Ujság, authored by novelist Mór Jókai.

== Works ==
=== Original works ===
- Német-, franczia-, és angolországi Uti jegyzetek [Travel Notes from Germany, France, and England], 2 vols., Halle, 1846.
- Az országgyülés rendezéséről [On the Organization of the National Assembly], Pest, 1847.
- Béla [novel], 2 vols., Pest, 1853.
- Dicső napok [Glorious Days], 3 vols., Pest, 1857.
- Az 1790–91-iki 26-ik vallásügyi törvény keletkezésének történelme. Közjogi észrevételekkel a bécsi és linzi békekötések alapján [History of the Genesis of Law Article 26 of 1790/91 Regarding Religion. With Public Law Observations Based on the Treaties of Vienna and Linz], Pest, 1857.
- Geschichte der Entstehung des 26. Gesetzartikels von 1790/1 über die Religionsangelegenheit, Pest, 1857.

=== Translations ===
- Harriet Beecher Stowe, Tamás bátya kunyhója, vagy néger élet a rabszolgatartó amerikai államokban [Uncle Tom's Cabin; or, Life Among the Lowly], translated from English, Pest, 1853.
- Harriet Beecher Stowe, Kulcs Tamás bátya kunyhójához [A Key to Uncle Tom's Cabin],
