= Iosif Vulcan =

Austro-Hungarian magazine editor and writer (1841 - 1907)

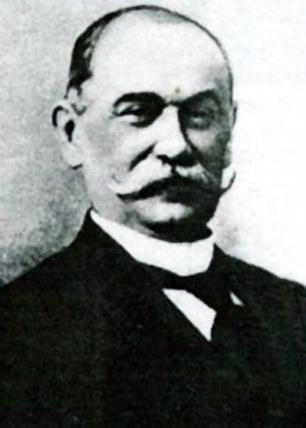
Iosif Vulcan

Iosif Vulcan (Note: Romanian pronunciation: [ˈjosif vulˈkan]) (March 31, 1841 – September 8, 1907) was an ethnic Romanian Austro-Hungarian magazine editor, poet, playwright, novelist and cultural figure. He founded the literary magazine Familia, which he published for four decades. A titular member of the Romanian Academy, he presided over its literary section from 1904 to 1907.

== Biography ==
=== Early life ===
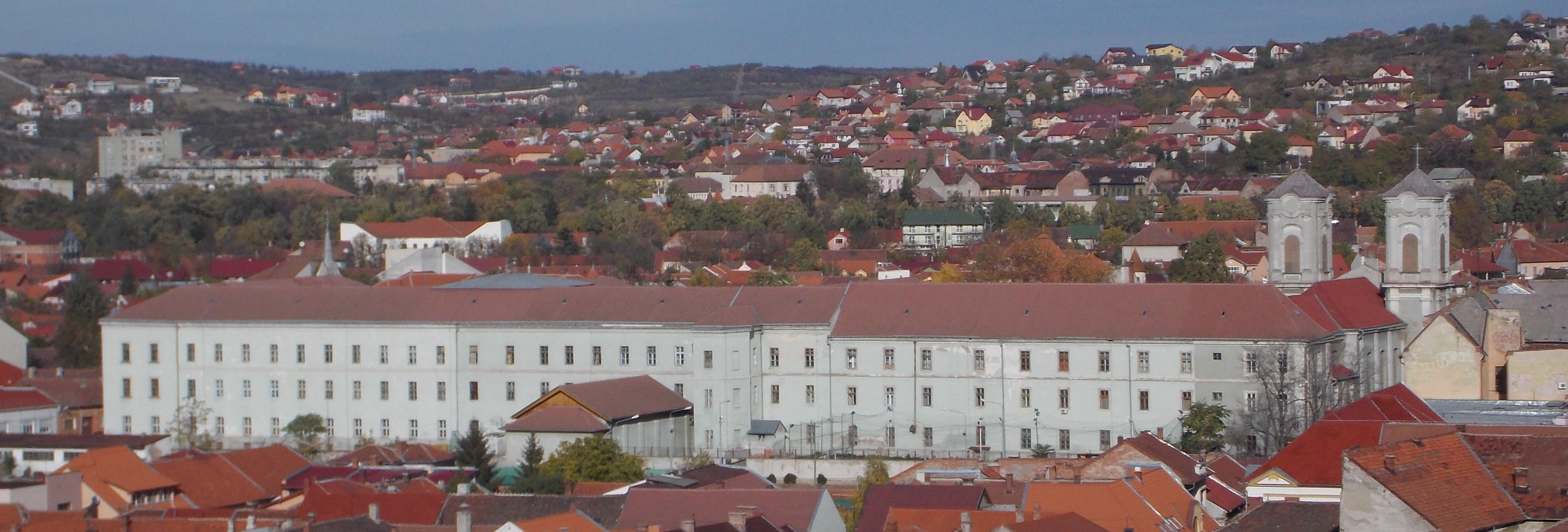
Vulcan's high school, now the Mihai Eminescu National College

Vulcan was born in Pusztahollód, Bihar County, in the Kingdom of Hungary, now Holod, Bihor County, Romania. His father Nicolae was the local Greek-Catholic parish priest from 1831 to 1844. Nicolae was a nephew of Bishop Samuil Vulcan and was born in Șinca Veche to a family originating in Wallachia. His mother Victoria (Viktória) Irinyi came from an old family of Romanian origins called Irimie before its name was Magyarized. The daughter of a schoolmaster from Létavértes (Leta Mare), her brothers were József and János Irinyi. Vulcan's parents had six children, five of whom died early. His father was transferred to the Létavértes parish in 1844 before being named canon in Oradea (Nagyvárad) in 1879. Vulcan was attached to his parents as well as to Létavértes, where his mother is buried. He attended primary school there from 1847 to 1851, returning for his high school and university vacations. In later years, he came back for leisure as his busy schedule permitted.

He attended the Premonstratensian high school in Oradea from 1851 to 1859, followed by a law degree from the University of Pest; he passed the bar examination, but soon devoted himself to literature. In 1853, while in high school, he helped start a magazine that appeared until 1870. There are poems of his written in Pest in 1859, when he was eighteen. His earliest dated poem, "Câte stele sunt pe ceriuri…", was written at Létavértes on 10 August 1859 and later included in his first volume. He became involved with Gura Satului ("The Voice of the Village") in Pest in 1861 and thereafter with Concordia and Aurora Română. He wrote feuilletons for Concordia, a Romanian political newspaper. Vulcan often spent time in Létavértes during his student days, writing his first love poems there, about a sweetheart who lived in the town.

=== Familia and later activity ===
Soare cu ploaie ("Sunshower"), a one-act comedy published at Brașov in 1898

He launched Familia literary magazine in Pest-Buda in 1865 and would lead it for some forty years. In 1866, he published his first volume of poetry. The same year, "De-aș avea" ("If I Had"), a poem that marked the proper literary debut of sixteen-year-old Mihai Eminovici, appeared in Familia. Vulcan received it with enthusiasm, publishing him under the more Romanian-sounding name Mihai Eminescu. Vulcan later recounted that the poems sent from Cernăuți in February 1866 were signed "M. Eminovici", and that he, "without asking him, Romanianized his name and published them under the name Eminescu". A good part of the latter's work would continue to appear in Vulcan's magazine until 1883. In 1867, Vulcan visited France, a bold act for a resident of the Austrian Empire, which encouraged German-language education. In 1868, he traveled to Romania. In 1869, in addition to a volume of short stories, he published a biography of Prince Carol, as well as an anthology of writings by Andrei Mureșanu, Ion Heliade Rădulescu, Timotei Cipariu, August Treboniu Laurian, Mihail Kogălniceanu, George Bariţ and Vasile Alecsandri. He showed a sincere admiration for Romania and its prince. In July 1869, he published in Familia an appeal, "Să fondâmu teatru natiunalu" ("Let us found a national theatre"), calling for contributions to a fund for a Romanian-language theatre; among those who answered was the young Eminescu, whose article "Repertoriulu nostru teatralu" appeared in the magazine in January 1870. A preparatory programme signed by Vincențiu Babeș, Iosif Hodoşiu, Petru Mihályi, Alexandru Mocioni and Vulcan followed in March 1870, and the Society for the Creation of a Romanian Theatre Fund was set up at Deva on 4-5 October 1870, with Hodoşiu as president and Vulcan as secretary; from 1870, Familia served as the society's official organ. The fund reported at the society's general assemblies grew from 3,670 florins in 1870 to 54,785 florins in 1890. Vulcan presided over the society from 1895 to 1907; his own comedies remained staples of its amateur network, which staged them 166 times in 112 Transylvanian localities between 1900 and 1906, led by Sărăcie lucie and Ruga de la Chizătău.

In addition to his work in Romanian, Vulcan published Hungarian-language translations of Romanian poets in various magazines. In 1871, he was elected as an external member of the Kisfaludy Society; his reception speech of 31 May 1871 dealt with Romanian folk poetry. On 20 November 1871, he married Aurelia Popovici in a mixed-faith marriage (he Greek-Catholic, she Orthodox) that was unusual for the time, with Iosif Hodoşiu and his wife as godparents; the couple led a happy life together and she inspired a number of his poems. The daughter of a lawyer and landowner from Comlăuș, she lived until 1928. In 1877, he collaborated on a Hungarian-language anthology of Romanian folk poetry, contributing twelve ballads, sixteen romances and a preface on the general subject. The anthology, Román népdalok, was published by the Kisfaludy Society in Budapest, with György Ember and Iulian Grozescu as fellow contributors. Over the course of the 1870s, he continued publishing short stories, novels, travel accounts and a comedy play. He made periodic trips to Bucharest, where he developed connections, gathered material for his writing but also savored the cultural and national atmosphere he found in the Romanian capital. These visits increased starting in the early 1890s as his involvement there deepened.

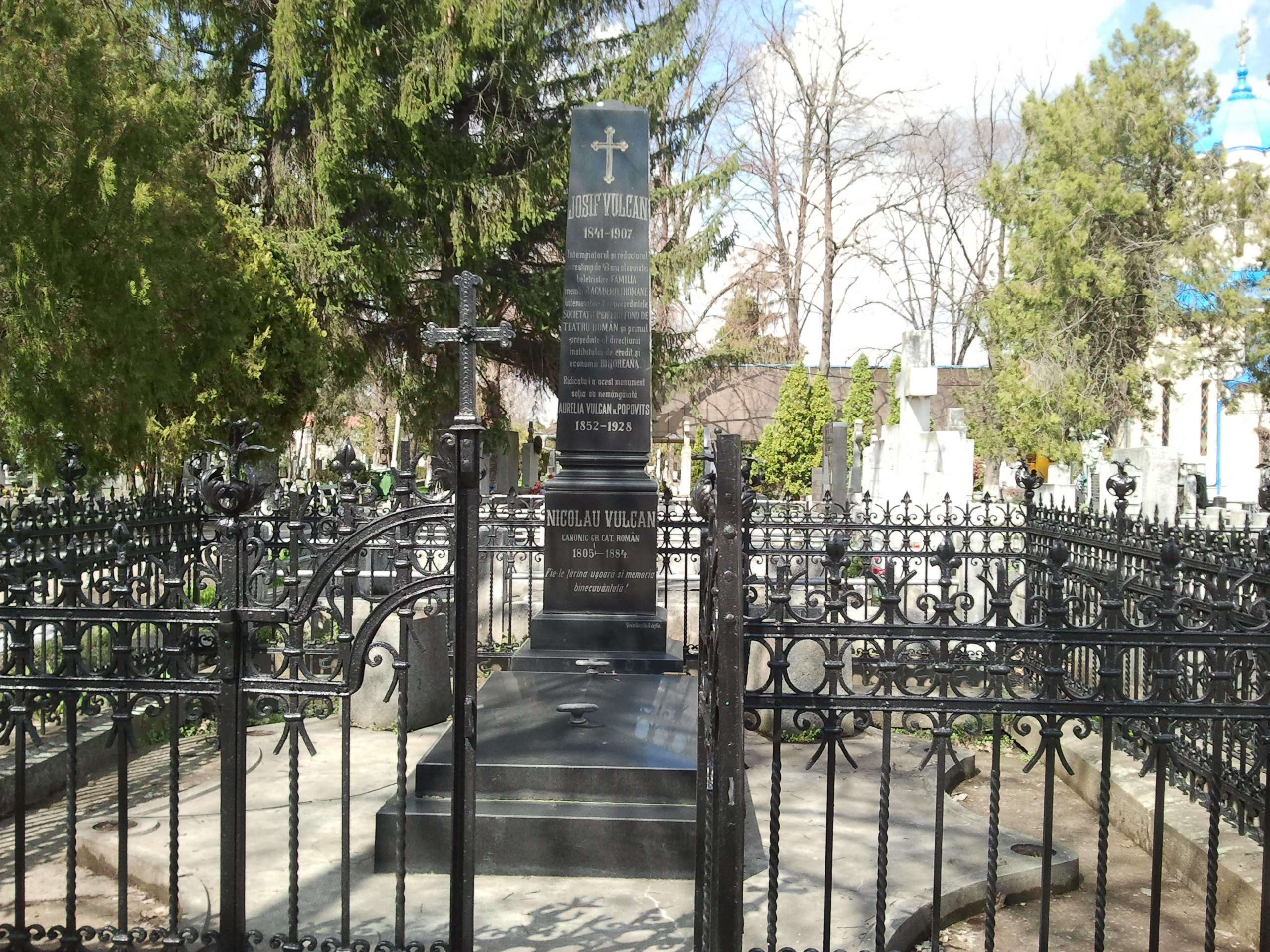
Vulcan's grave

In 1879, he was elected corresponding member of the Romanian Academy. In 1880, he moved to Oradea, taking Familia to a new headquarters. Lira mea ("My Lyre"), a work of erotic and patriotic poems, came out in 1882. In 1891, he became a titular member of the Romanian Academy, giving his introductory speech on Dimitrie Țichindeal. Nicolae Iorga commented that of the members from outside Romania, Vulcan was the most regular attendee. Indeed, from 1891 until shortly before his death, he was present at every regular session, taking part in the Academy's activities and rigorously carrying out the assignments he received. He served as a referee in the Academy's prize competitions, and in April 1900 he successfully proposed George Coșbuc for corresponding membership. From March 1904 until April 1907, he was president of the Academy's literary section, elected on Titu Maiorescu's proposal. In June 1904, Oradea celebrated the fortieth anniversary of his literary activity and of Familia. During the 1890s, encouraged by the reception of his first play, he published a number of other comedies. Against the backdrop of the Transylvanian Memorandum trial and rising national sentiment, he wrote a historical tragedy about the young Stephen III of Moldavia; this premiered at the National Theatre Bucharest in October 1892. He gave frequent speeches at meetings of ASTRA and at other cultural events throughout Transylvania. In 1902, during the authorities' confiscation of Teodor V. Păcățian's documentary volume Cartea de Aur, one of the seized copies was taken from Vulcan's home, a fact recorded with irony by Oradea's government-aligned Hungarian newspaper Szabadság. He died in Oradea on 26 August/8 September 1907 of acute nephritis. Bishop Demetriu Radu officiated the funeral service, with speeches given by numerous Romanian and Hungarian cultural associations. He was buried in the Olosig cemetery in Oradea. His remains were later moved to Oradea's Rulikowski cemetery. After his death, his widow donated his literary estate, comprising over a hundred volumes, manuscripts and correspondence, to the ASTRA Museum in Sibiu. Taking account of Bogdan Petriceicu Hasdeu's death one day earlier, critic Ilarie Chendi commented: "A day after Hasdeu, a much smaller flame was extinguished: the life of the elderly Iosif Vulcan. The late academician did not have the character of a great man, or of a fighter, or of an erudite personage, but few achieved more beautiful results than he did through perseverance and love of his work."

== Appraisal and legacy ==
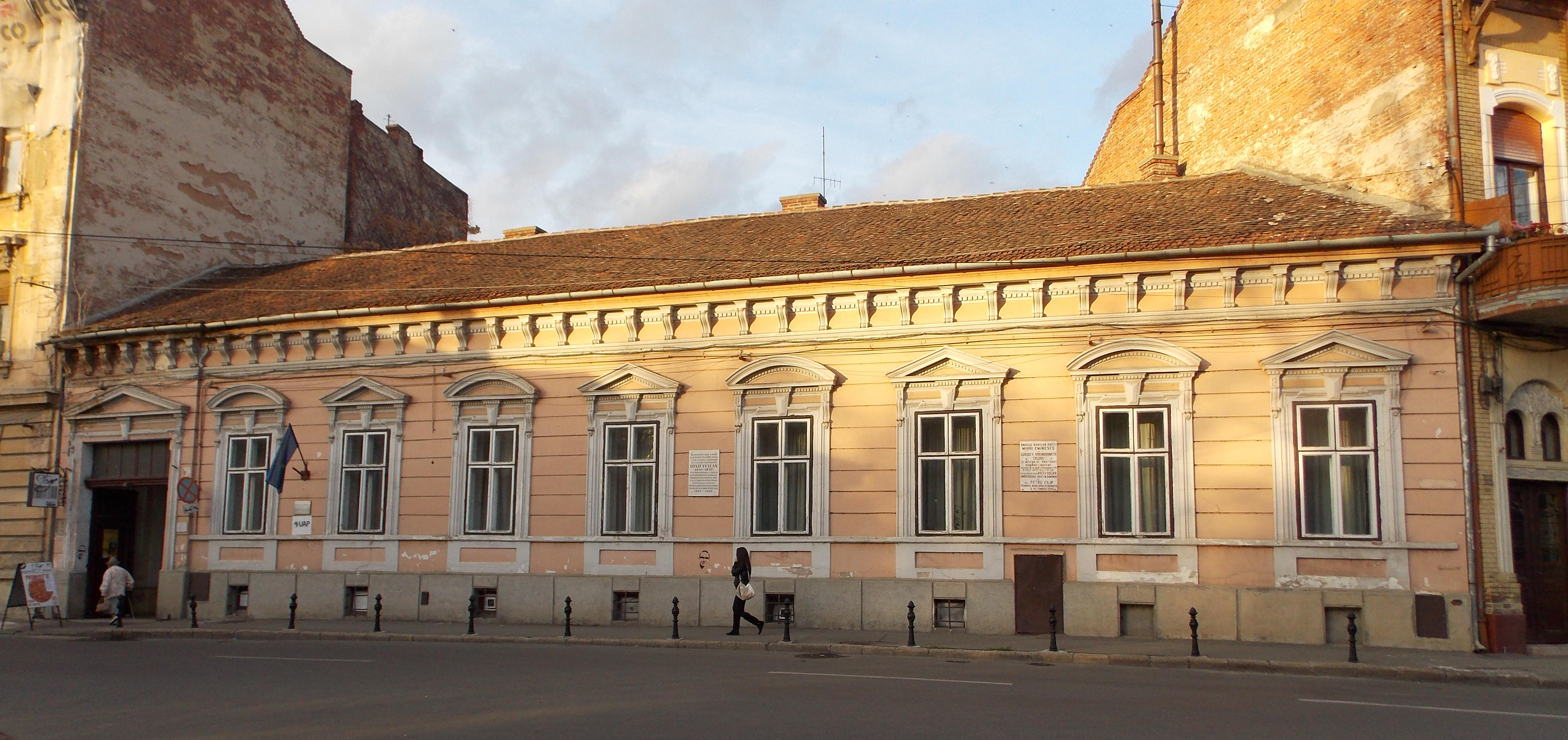
Iosif Vulcan Memorial Museum

According to literary critic Cornelia Ștefănescu, Vulcan can be seen primarily as an enthusiast, a man who wrote for various magazines in Transylvania and several in Pest, having written two by hand in his schooldays, before devoting his energies to Familia; who travelled widely and wrote about his experiences; who helped initiate societies before organizing their activities, crisscrossing Transylvania (including stops in Gherla, Deva, Șomcuta Mare, Năsăud and Oradea) while promoting Romanian culture. She observes that his writing lacks external stylization, "saccharine images, complaisant rhetoric or gratuitous elegies", instead drawing its essence from authentic, realist folk roots.

The Iosif Vulcan Memorial Museum is located in Oradea on a street that bears his name. Inaugurated in 1965 in the house that he inhabited from 1897 until 1907, it is furnished with objects that belonged to him. A bust of Vulcan by the sculptor Anghel Chiciu was unveiled in the city in November 1927, on the initiative of the "Cele Trei Crișuri" cultural society. The same city hosts the Iosif Vulcan National College, a secondary school that used his name from 1920 to 1990 and again since 1999. Bistrița, Cluj-Napoca, Curtici, Salonta, Satu Mare, Săcueni, Timișoara and Valea lui Mihai also have streets named after him.

Iosif Vulcan Memorial House, Holod

In his native village of Holod, the house where Vulcan was born was restored and opened as the Iosif Vulcan Memorial House in October 2024.

== Selected works ==
- Poesii, Pest, 1866
- Panteonul român (portraits and biographies), Pest, 1869
- Novele, t. I-III, Pest, 1872-1874
- Sclavul amorului (novel, 3 vols.), Pest, 1873
- Ranele națiunii (novel, 3 vols.), Budapest, 1876
- Gorunul lui Horea (historical play), 1876
- Román népdalok (anthology of Romanian folk poetry in Hungarian translation, with György Ember and Iulian Grozescu), Kisfaludy Society, Budapest, 1877
- Mireasă pentru mireasă (comedy), Budapest, 1877
- Lira mea (poems), Oradea, 1882
- De la sate (short stories and sketches), Oradea-Mare, 1883
- Ruga de la Chizătău (folk comedy), Oradea-Mare, 1890
- Dimitrie Cichindeal - Date noi despre viața și activitatea lui (Academy reception speech), Bucharest, 1893
- Ștefan Vodă cel tânăr (tragedy), Oradea-Mare, 1893
- Sărăcie lucie (folk comedy), Oradea-Mare, 1894
- Soare cu ploaie (comedy), Brașov, 1898
- Gărgăunii dragostei (comedy), Oradea-Mare, 1899
- Schițe de călătorie (travel sketches, posthumous edition by Constantin Cubleșan), Sport-Turism, Bucharest, 1982
- Scrieri (selected writings, posthumous edition by Lucian Drimba), Minerva, Bucharest, 1987-1994
