= Familia (magazine) =

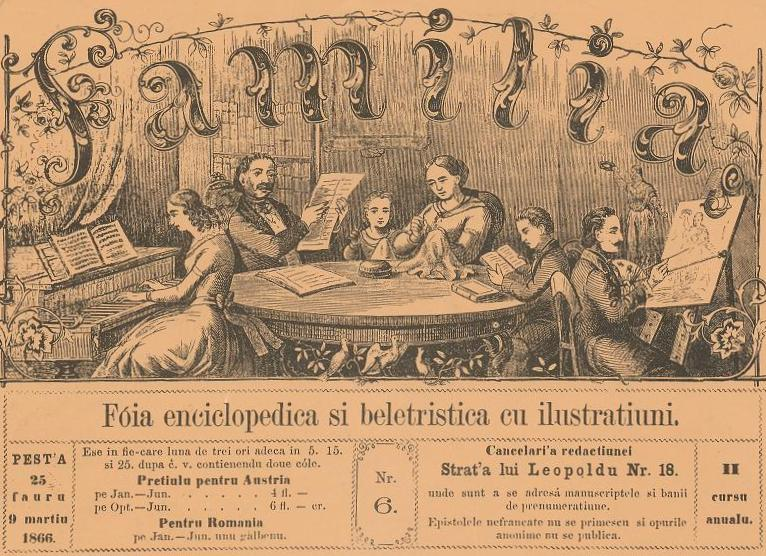
- Logo, dated March 9, 1866
- Editor: Iosif Vulcan
- Categories: literary magazine
- First issue: June 5, 1865
- Final issue: December 31, 1906
- Country: Hungary, Romania
- Language: Romanian

The Romanian-language Familia literary magazine was first published by Iosif Vulcan in Budapest from 5 June 1865 to 17 April 1880. The magazine moved to Oradea (Nagyvárad) and continued publication from 27 April 1880 to 31 December 1906.

Several new series of the magazine were subsequently published:

- Serie II, 1926–1928
- Serie III 1934 - 1943
- Serie IV 1944 - 1945
- Serie V 1965 - 2020
- Serie VI 2021 - present
