= János Jeszenák =

Hungarian politician (1800–1849)

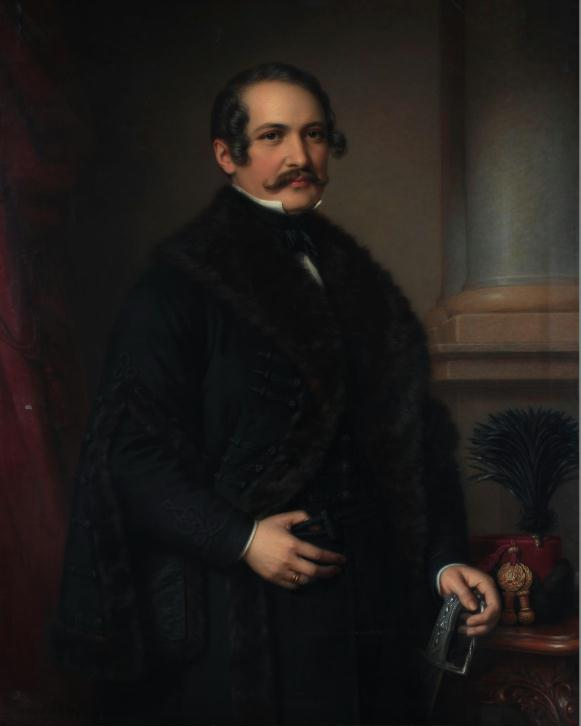
- by Miklós Barabás
- Born: January 22, 1800; Pozsony, Kingdom of Hungary (today: Bratislava, Slovakia)
- Died: October 10, 1849 (aged 49); Pest, Kingdom of Hungary
- Occupation: politician

Baron János Jeszenák de Királyfia (Slovak: Ján Jesenák; 22 January 1800 – 10 October 1849) was a Hungarian politician, noble, Inspector of the Lutheran Diocese of Cisdanubia. He is a martyr of the Hungarian Revolution of 1848. His great-grandchild was Count János Esterházy.

== Family ==
Baron János (IV) Jeszenák was born into an old noble family in Pozsony (today: Bratislava, Slovakia) on 22 January 1800. The family had lands in Királyfia, Pozsony County (today part of Šamorín). János' father was János III, Inspector of the Lutheran Diocese of Cisdanubia from 1814 to 1823, who donated his books to the Hungarian National Museum in 1808. János had a younger sister, Lujza, who married to Count Sámuel Teleki (1792–1857)

János IV married Countess Alojzia Forgách de Ghymes et Gács (born 1810). They had several children. The oldest one, János (V) served as a hussar lieutenant in the Imperial and Royal Army. He was the last male member of the family, because his younger brothers, Sándor and Béla died in childhood. János Jeszenák also had two daughters: Lujza was the wife of Gyula Draskóczi. Gizella married to Count István Esterházy de Galántha (1822–1899), honvéd captain, Member of Parliament and Lord Lieutenant (Count; comes) of Pozsony County (1875-1889). Theirs descendant was Count János Esterházy.

== Career ==
After finishing his studies in Pozsony, he traveled around Europe, including Italy, France and the United Kingdom. As a member of the Hungarian delegation, he participated in the coronation ceremony of George IV on 19 July 1821 led by ambassador, later Minister besides the King Paul III Anton, Prince Esterházy.

His principal residence and official domicile was located in Szenicze (today Senica, Slovakia) where his family owned a farm. He attended the council of Nyitra County and joined to the opposition. There he developed a fondness for the ideas of Count István Széchenyi, who became his pen-pal and friend.

He became Inspector General of the Deanery of Nyitra, and, since 1841, he was appointed Inspector of the Lutheran Diocese of Cisdanubia, besides Count Károly Zay. He held that position until his death. During the Hungarian Reform Era, he participated as an oppositional emissary in the works of the Upper House of the Diet of Hungary. He supported, among others, Széchenyi's idea about construction of a bridge between Buda and Pest, proposal of Orders about new buildings of the Hungarian National Museum and also embraced the cause of the "Védegylet" defence society. He came into a closer contact with Count Lajos Batthyány, while his relationship with Széchenyi had broken down.

As a reliable reformer, he was appointed Lord Lieutenant (Count; comes) then Government Commissioner of Nyitra County by Minister of the Interior Bertalan Szemere. He was nominated to the position of Government Commissioner in the army which fought against the rebels in Upper Hungary.

== Sources ==
- Hermann, Róbert: Jeszenák János báró. In: Vértanúk könyve. A magyar forradalom és szabadságharc mártírjai 1848-1854. Rubicon könyvek. Bp. 2007. pp. 240–245.
- Jeszenszky Géza emlékbeszéde
- Hermann, Róbert: 1848–1849. A szabadságharc hadtörténete. Korona Kiadó, Bp., 2001
