= János Irinyi =

Hungarian chemist and inventor

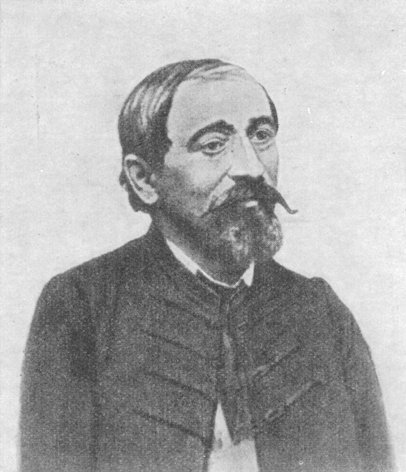
- János Irinyi
- Born: 18 May 1817; Albis, Kingdom of Hungary
- Died: 17 December 1895 (aged 78); Vértes, Kingdom of Hungary

János Irinyi (sometimes also spelled János Irínyi; Hungarian pronunciation: [ˈjaːnoʃ ˈiriɲi]; in Romanian: Ioan Irimie; 18 May 1817 – 17 December 1895) was a Hungarian chemist and inventor of the noiseless and non-explosive match. He achieved this by mixing the yellow (also called white) phosphorus with lead dioxide instead of the potassium chlorate used previously.

== Life ==
The Irinyi family is an old Hungarian noble family of Szatmár County. It took its name from the village of Iriny in the county, which it owned, and at the beginning of the 19th century the family also held joint ownership of several other settlements in the county. The ancestors of the family fought under King Ladislaus IV of Hungary at the Battle of Marchfeld in 1278, where they killed the enemy king Ottokar II of Bohemia, and captured his son alive. For this service, King Ladislaus IV granted them the estate of Iriny in Szatmár County in 1278. The family's coat of arms also refers to this event.

His father, János Irinyi had six children. Viktória (the mother of the famous Romanian writer and journalist Iosif Vulcan), Heléna, János, Antónia, József and Rozália. Of these, János (1817), Antónia (1820) and József (1822) were born in Albis, in Bihar County. János was baptized in Greek Orthodox Church faith, but he later converted to Calvinism.

Together with his brother József, János Irinyi took part in the Hungarian Revolution of 1848 and was one of the first to draft the outline of the Twelve Points.

== Legacy ==
Asteroid 106869 Irinyi, discovered by Hungarian astronomer Krisztián Sárneczky and László L. Kiss at Piszkéstető Station in 2000, was named in his memory. The official naming citation was published by the Minor Planet Center on 22 January 2008 (M.P.C. 61767).
