= Jeffrey S. Medkeff =

American astronomer (1968–2008)

- Born: 1968; Akron, Ohio, U.S.
- Died: August 3, 2008 (aged 39–40); Houston, Texas, U.S.
- Other name: Jeff Medkeff
- Education: Ohio State University
- Scientific career
- Fields: Astronomy
- Workplaces: Junk Bond Observatory, Rockland Observatory, Small Telescope Astronomical Research Observatory, Sky & Telescope

Jeffrey S. Medkeff (1968 – 3 August 2008), usually known as Jeff Medkeff, was a prominent science writer and educator. He was also a designer of robotic telescopes, a minor philanthropist, and an advocate of personal and sexual freedom.

== Early life ==
Medkeff was born in Akron, Ohio in 1968, and was raised in nearby Cuyahoga Falls. He contracted asthma early in life, and endured several prolonged hospitalizations as a child. The condition was severe enough to restrict his activity and pose a threat to his life. He attributed a lifelong love of reading and self-directed learning to this experience. He was a skeptic and an atheist.

== Career as a systems professional ==
Minor planets discovered: 10
15512 Snyder	18 October 1999
37163 Huachucaclub	19 November 2000
38203 Sanner	19 June 1999
86279 Brucegary	17 October 1999
106537 McCarthy	23 November 2000
106545 Colanduno	28 November 2000
158092 Frasercain	28 November 2000
165347 Philplait	23 November 2000
(230080) 2000 WE_{11}	20 November 2000
(285784) 2000 WW_{29}	25 November 2000

Medkeff was educated at Ohio State University. He was a principal in a technology start-up in the early 1990s, which was sold at great profit. He later took a position as a systems analyst at Ohio State, where he worked while his wife completed veterinary school.

In 1994, Jeff moved to Sierra Vista, Arizona, where he began working at Junk Bond Observatory in an asteroid hunting program. Quickly tiring of the tedious work, he began development of an automated observing and reduction system for this work.

In 1997, he adopted an early form of the Astronomy Common Object Model standard as his primary means of communicating with devices such as telescopes and cameras. He credited the ability to use pre-existing drivers and utility objects as freeing him to concentrate on design and workflow issues for the observatory.

The results were reported in a series of papers to the Minor Planet Amateur-Professional Workshops and in journals. By 1999, the observatory's acquisition of asteroid images was fully automated, and a considerable amount of the reduction was automatic as well. Medkeff founded Rockland Observatory around this time, and was later appointed director of the privately held Small Telescope Astronomical Research Observatory; further development was done at both facilities.

By the end of 2000, the process of selecting targets for a night's observing was under computer control, while still allowing astronomer-specified targets to be defined, and allowing targets of opportunity to interrupt the night's scheduled observing. By this time, a number of observatories in Arizona, Australia and Europe were utilizing Medkeff's system in whole or part. From 2000 to 2004, he refined the software, and also adapted it for use in supernova surveys, cataclysmic variable star photometry, and trans-Neptunian object surveys. By 2004, a number of famous observatories had licensed the software or adapted the source code for their use.

As a result of this work, Medkeff discovered a number of asteroids. He named these asteroids in honor of fellow scientists and skeptics such as Fraser Cain, Derek Colanduno, Robynn McCarthy, PZ Myers, Phil Plait, Michael Stackpole and Rebecca Watson. In 2003, the International Astronomical Union recognised his contribution to science by naming asteroid 41450 Medkeff in his honor, noting that "he has contributed to the discovery and photometric observations of thousands of minor planets."

In the spring of 2004, Medkeff sold his company to a firm specializing in automating seismic observations and retired from the technology field.

== Career as science writer and educator ==
Medkeff began writing on science topics in the 1980s, with his first published article appearing in the September, 1986 issue of Sky & Telescope magazine. He joined that publication as a Contributing Editor in 1997, writing many articles. During this period, he also served as a source for numerous journalists and offered background materials on asteroids to many journalists.

In the late 1990s, he was also active in an astronomy club whose mission included public education about astronomy. He developed several talks covering various topics of interest to the general public, and gave them to a number of venues. He was also a prominent speaker on the star party circuit, delivering talks at the Texas Star Party, the Riverside Telescope Makers' Convention, the Northern Arizona Star Party, and several others.

In 2004, Medkeff and his wife moved to Eagle River, Alaska. Having sold his business in Arizona and resigned from his commitment at Sky & Telescope, he concentrated on the development of astronomy and science-oriented educational and public outreach programs. He joined the team of amateur astronomers offering free astronomy lectures at the Eagle River Nature Center, and first delivered a popular talk on stellar evolution at that venue in early 2005.

He went on to develop several more presentations and distributed background material on science to journalists, developing teaching materials and curriculum for teachers and home-schoolers. As of late 2005, he was devoting his personal fortune to this effort, and had not accepted outside funding.

In December 2007 Medkeff started the Blue Collar Scientist blog, where he wrote about science, science communication, skepticism and atheism.

== Cancer and death ==
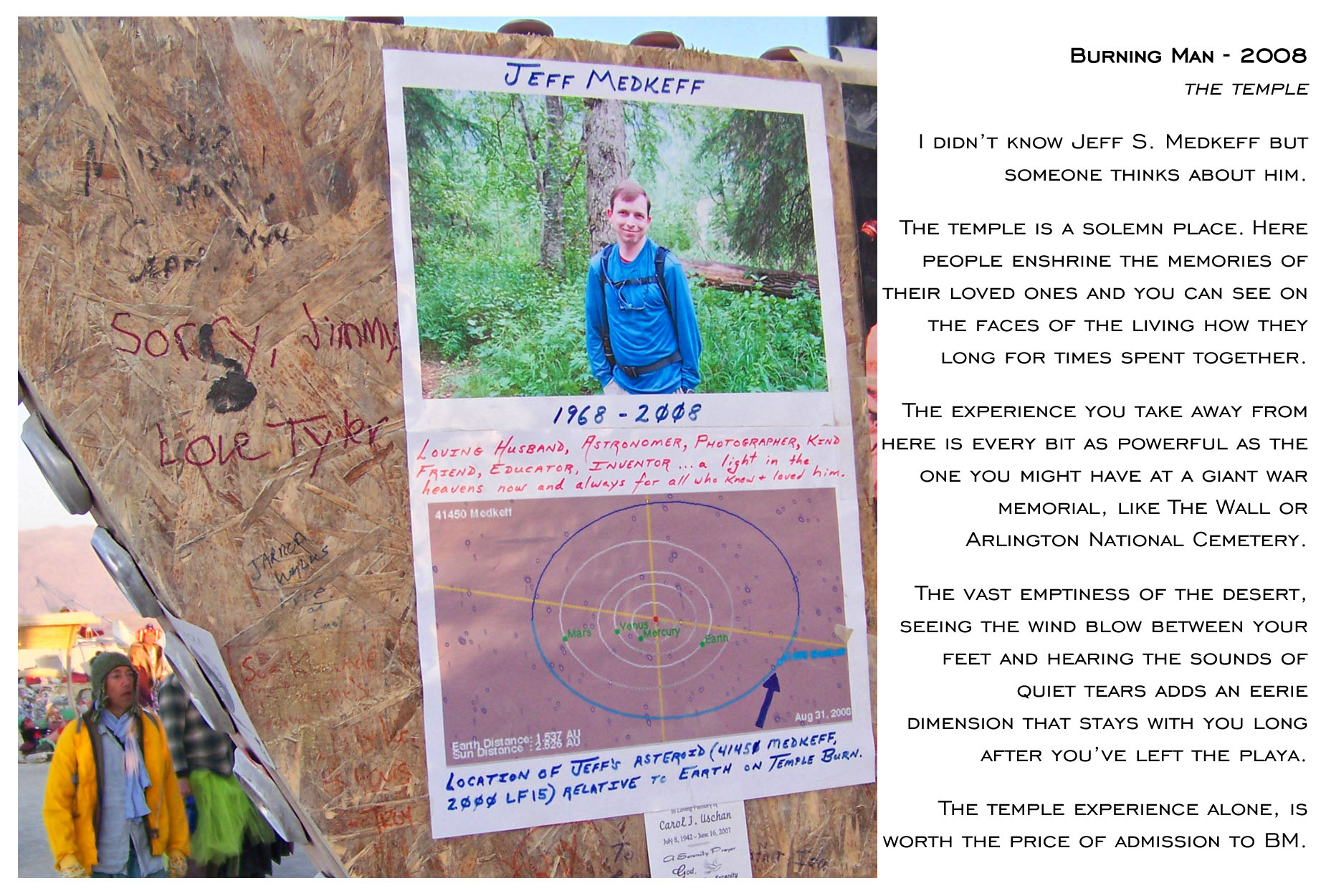
Memorial for Medkeff at the Burning Man festival

In early June 2008 Medkeff was diagnosed with primary liver cancer (hepatocellular carcinoma) and sought treatment at M.D. Anderson Cancer Center in Houston, Texas. He died of cancer complications on August 3, 2008.

== See Also ==
1. Healy, David, et al. Small Robotic Observatories: Operations, Deployment, Future Developments. Minor Planet Amateur-Professional Workshop, 2001.
2. Healy, David. Presentation at the Image the Sky conference, 2003.
3. Sierra Vista (Arizona) Herald, June 23, 1998.
4. Levy, David; Levy, Wendee. Let's Talk Stars, air date October 8, 2002.
5. Denny, Bob. IAPPP 2001.
6. Bakich, Michael. The Cambridge Encyclopedia of Amateur Astronomy. 2003. (Foreword by Jeff Medkeff.)
7. Medkeff, Jeff. Automatic Asteroid Hunting, Sky & Telescope, August 2000
8. Medkeff, Jeff. The ASCOM Revolution, Sky & Telescope, May 2000
9. Medkeff, Jeff. My Rubbertown Roots, Sky & Telescope, July 1998
10. Medkeff, Jeff. Stellafane: A First-Time Visit, Sky & Telescope, November 1986
