= List of minor planets: 106001–107000 =

The following is a partial list of minor planets, running from minor-planet number 106001 through 107000, inclusive. The primary data for this and other partial lists is based on JPL's "Small-Body Orbital Elements" and data available from the Minor Planet Center. Critical list information is also provided by the MPC, unless otherwise specified from Lowell Observatory. A detailed description of the table's columns and additional sources are given on the main page including a complete list of every page in this series, and a statistical break-up on the dynamical classification of minor planets.

Also see the summary list of all named bodies in numerical and alphabetical order, and the corresponding naming citations for the number range of this particular list. New namings may only be added to this list after official publication, as the preannouncement of names is condemned by the Working Group for Small Bodies Nomenclature of the International Astronomical Union.

Near-Earth obj.	MBA (inner)	MBA (outer)	Centaur
Mars-crosser	MBA (middle)	Jupiter trojan	Trans-Neptunian obj.
Unclassified

== 106001–106100 ==
Designation			Discovery			Properties		Ref
Permanent	Provisional	Named after	Date	Site	Discoverer(s)	Category	Diam.	Ref
106001	2000 SR_{283}	—	September 23, 2000	Socorro	LINEAR	L5	17 km	MPC · JPL
106002	2000 SE_{284}	—	September 23, 2000	Socorro	LINEAR	·	2.1 km	MPC · JPL
106003	2000 SQ_{284}	—	September 23, 2000	Socorro	LINEAR	EOS	4.1 km	MPC · JPL
106004	2000 SN_{285}	—	September 23, 2000	Socorro	LINEAR	·	3.4 km	MPC · JPL
106005	2000 SO_{285}	—	September 23, 2000	Socorro	LINEAR	·	4.3 km	MPC · JPL
106006	2000 SY_{285}	—	September 24, 2000	Socorro	LINEAR	VER	5.3 km	MPC · JPL
106007	2000 SX_{287}	—	September 26, 2000	Socorro	LINEAR	·	4.4 km	MPC · JPL
106008	2000 SY_{288}	—	September 27, 2000	Socorro	LINEAR	·	1.4 km	MPC · JPL
106009	2000 SG_{290}	—	September 27, 2000	Socorro	LINEAR	·	4.8 km	MPC · JPL
106010	2000 SR_{290}	—	September 27, 2000	Socorro	LINEAR	·	6.5 km	MPC · JPL
106011	2000 SU_{291}	—	September 27, 2000	Socorro	LINEAR	·	3.2 km	MPC · JPL
106012	2000 SF_{292}	—	September 27, 2000	Socorro	LINEAR	·	1.2 km	MPC · JPL
106013	2000 SQ_{292}	—	September 27, 2000	Socorro	LINEAR	EUP	12 km	MPC · JPL
106014	2000 SZ_{292}	—	September 27, 2000	Socorro	LINEAR	·	4.4 km	MPC · JPL
106015	2000 SK_{293}	—	September 27, 2000	Socorro	LINEAR	·	2.6 km	MPC · JPL
106016	2000 SS_{293}	—	September 27, 2000	Socorro	LINEAR	·	5.2 km	MPC · JPL
106017	2000 SH_{294}	—	September 27, 2000	Socorro	LINEAR	·	1.2 km	MPC · JPL
106018	2000 SK_{294}	—	September 27, 2000	Socorro	LINEAR	·	6.8 km	MPC · JPL
106019	2000 SN_{294}	—	September 27, 2000	Socorro	LINEAR	EOS	4.2 km	MPC · JPL
106020	2000 SS_{294}	—	September 27, 2000	Socorro	LINEAR	·	7.2 km	MPC · JPL
106021	2000 SX_{294}	—	September 27, 2000	Socorro	LINEAR	EOS	5.6 km	MPC · JPL
106022	2000 SK_{296}	—	September 28, 2000	Socorro	LINEAR	·	4.0 km	MPC · JPL
106023	2000 SN_{296}	—	September 28, 2000	Socorro	LINEAR	·	4.5 km	MPC · JPL
106024	2000 SC_{297}	—	September 28, 2000	Socorro	LINEAR	·	7.0 km	MPC · JPL
106025	2000 SG_{297}	—	September 28, 2000	Socorro	LINEAR	·	3.7 km	MPC · JPL
106026	2000 ST_{297}	—	September 28, 2000	Socorro	LINEAR	(1118)	7.9 km	MPC · JPL
106027	2000 SV_{298}	—	September 28, 2000	Socorro	LINEAR	·	1.4 km	MPC · JPL
106028	2000 SB_{299}	—	September 28, 2000	Socorro	LINEAR	·	4.0 km	MPC · JPL
106029	2000 SN_{299}	—	September 28, 2000	Socorro	LINEAR	·	5.9 km	MPC · JPL
106030	2000 SB_{300}	—	September 28, 2000	Socorro	LINEAR	·	2.5 km	MPC · JPL
106031	2000 SL_{300}	—	September 28, 2000	Socorro	LINEAR	·	7.8 km	MPC · JPL
106032	2000 SO_{302}	—	September 28, 2000	Socorro	LINEAR	·	6.0 km	MPC · JPL
106033	2000 SJ_{303}	—	September 28, 2000	Socorro	LINEAR	VER	7.7 km	MPC · JPL
106034	2000 SK_{303}	—	September 28, 2000	Socorro	LINEAR	·	5.6 km	MPC · JPL
106035	2000 SU_{303}	—	September 28, 2000	Socorro	LINEAR	·	6.4 km	MPC · JPL
106036	2000 SE_{304}	—	September 30, 2000	Socorro	LINEAR	·	7.6 km	MPC · JPL
106037	2000 SU_{304}	—	September 30, 2000	Socorro	LINEAR	EOS	4.0 km	MPC · JPL
106038	2000 SG_{305}	—	September 30, 2000	Socorro	LINEAR	·	6.1 km	MPC · JPL
106039	2000 SH_{305}	—	September 30, 2000	Socorro	LINEAR	(16286)	3.6 km	MPC · JPL
106040	2000 SR_{305}	—	September 30, 2000	Socorro	LINEAR	·	1.9 km	MPC · JPL
106041	2000 SU_{305}	—	September 30, 2000	Socorro	LINEAR	slow	7.4 km	MPC · JPL
106042	2000 SK_{306}	—	September 30, 2000	Socorro	LINEAR	·	5.2 km	MPC · JPL
106043	2000 SA_{307}	—	September 30, 2000	Socorro	LINEAR	(5931)	7.6 km	MPC · JPL
106044	2000 SB_{307}	—	September 30, 2000	Socorro	LINEAR	EOS	3.9 km	MPC · JPL
106045	2000 SD_{307}	—	September 30, 2000	Socorro	LINEAR	·	4.5 km	MPC · JPL
106046	2000 SF_{307}	—	September 30, 2000	Socorro	LINEAR	EOS	3.5 km	MPC · JPL
106047	2000 SG_{307}	—	September 30, 2000	Socorro	LINEAR	·	4.8 km	MPC · JPL
106048	2000 SW_{307}	—	September 30, 2000	Socorro	LINEAR	·	1.9 km	MPC · JPL
106049	2000 SX_{307}	—	September 30, 2000	Socorro	LINEAR	·	2.9 km	MPC · JPL
106050	2000 SP_{308}	—	September 30, 2000	Socorro	LINEAR	·	1.2 km	MPC · JPL
106051	2000 SJ_{312}	—	September 27, 2000	Socorro	LINEAR	·	8.1 km	MPC · JPL
106052	2000 ST_{312}	—	September 27, 2000	Socorro	LINEAR	TIR	7.9 km	MPC · JPL
106053	2000 SJ_{313}	—	September 27, 2000	Socorro	LINEAR	·	13 km	MPC · JPL
106054	2000 SN_{313}	—	September 27, 2000	Socorro	LINEAR	·	3.1 km	MPC · JPL
106055	2000 SP_{313}	—	September 27, 2000	Socorro	LINEAR	·	6.9 km	MPC · JPL
106056	2000 SF_{315}	—	September 28, 2000	Socorro	LINEAR	EUP	10 km	MPC · JPL
106057	2000 SZ_{315}	—	September 30, 2000	Socorro	LINEAR	·	8.4 km	MPC · JPL
106058	2000 SE_{316}	—	September 30, 2000	Socorro	LINEAR	·	5.0 km	MPC · JPL
106059	2000 SK_{316}	—	September 30, 2000	Socorro	LINEAR	WAT	4.0 km	MPC · JPL
106060	2000 SS_{316}	—	September 30, 2000	Socorro	LINEAR	L5	17 km	MPC · JPL
106061	2000 SU_{317}	—	September 30, 2000	Socorro	LINEAR	WAT	3.7 km	MPC · JPL
106062	2000 ST_{318}	—	September 26, 2000	Socorro	LINEAR	·	4.5 km	MPC · JPL
106063	2000 SR_{319}	—	September 26, 2000	Socorro	LINEAR	TIR	10 km	MPC · JPL
106064	2000 SA_{323}	—	September 28, 2000	Socorro	LINEAR	·	4.7 km	MPC · JPL
106065	2000 ST_{324}	—	September 28, 2000	Kitt Peak	Spacewatch	ANF	2.6 km	MPC · JPL
106066	2000 SZ_{324}	—	September 28, 2000	Kitt Peak	Spacewatch	·	3.0 km	MPC · JPL
106067	2000 SC_{328}	—	September 30, 2000	Socorro	LINEAR	·	4.8 km	MPC · JPL
106068	2000 SC_{329}	—	September 27, 2000	Kitt Peak	Spacewatch	·	5.7 km	MPC · JPL
106069	2000 SJ_{330}	—	September 27, 2000	Socorro	LINEAR	·	1.8 km	MPC · JPL
106070	2000 SK_{333}	—	September 26, 2000	Haleakala	NEAT	·	1.7 km	MPC · JPL
106071	2000 SS_{335}	—	September 26, 2000	Haleakala	NEAT	·	2.8 km	MPC · JPL
106072	2000 SU_{335}	—	September 26, 2000	Haleakala	NEAT	·	7.4 km	MPC · JPL
106073	2000 SP_{338}	—	September 25, 2000	Haleakala	NEAT	·	3.6 km	MPC · JPL
106074	2000 SO_{339}	—	September 25, 2000	Haleakala	NEAT	·	1.9 km	MPC · JPL
106075	2000 SX_{339}	—	September 25, 2000	Kitt Peak	Spacewatch	·	1.3 km	MPC · JPL
106076	2000 SB_{345}	—	September 20, 2000	Haleakala	NEAT	·	3.9 km	MPC · JPL
106077	2000 SB_{347}	—	September 26, 2000	Haleakala	NEAT	·	2.8 km	MPC · JPL
106078	2000 SK_{347}	—	September 25, 2000	Socorro	LINEAR	TIR	4.3 km	MPC · JPL
106079	2000 SF_{348}	—	September 20, 2000	Socorro	LINEAR	·	6.7 km	MPC · JPL
106080	2000 SN_{348}	—	September 20, 2000	Socorro	LINEAR	·	6.1 km	MPC · JPL
106081	2000 SU_{348}	—	September 30, 2000	Anderson Mesa	LONEOS	·	5.5 km	MPC · JPL
106082	2000 SP_{350}	—	September 29, 2000	Anderson Mesa	LONEOS	·	6.0 km	MPC · JPL
106083	2000 SR_{352}	—	September 30, 2000	Anderson Mesa	LONEOS	·	4.7 km	MPC · JPL
106084	2000 SA_{355}	—	September 29, 2000	Anderson Mesa	LONEOS	·	6.1 km	MPC · JPL
106085	2000 SO_{355}	—	September 29, 2000	Anderson Mesa	LONEOS	LIX	6.0 km	MPC · JPL
106086	2000 SE_{356}	—	September 29, 2000	Anderson Mesa	LONEOS	·	3.3 km	MPC · JPL
106087	2000 SY_{357}	—	September 28, 2000	Anderson Mesa	LONEOS	·	5.8 km	MPC · JPL
106088	2000 SB_{359}	—	September 26, 2000	Anderson Mesa	LONEOS	·	7.0 km	MPC · JPL
106089	2000 SJ_{359}	—	September 26, 2000	Anderson Mesa	LONEOS	slow	5.8 km	MPC · JPL
106090	2000 SY_{359}	—	September 26, 2000	Anderson Mesa	LONEOS	·	2.5 km	MPC · JPL
106091	2000 SZ_{361}	—	September 23, 2000	Anderson Mesa	LONEOS	L5	15 km	MPC · JPL
106092	2000 SK_{362}	—	September 24, 2000	Anderson Mesa	LONEOS	·	3.8 km	MPC · JPL
106093	2000 SD_{366}	—	September 23, 2000	Anderson Mesa	LONEOS	·	7.4 km	MPC · JPL
106094	2000 SA_{368}	—	September 24, 2000	Socorro	LINEAR	·	3.6 km	MPC · JPL
106095	2000 SP_{369}	—	September 25, 2000	Anderson Mesa	LONEOS	·	4.7 km	MPC · JPL
106096	2000 TQ	—	October 2, 2000	Emerald Lane	L. Ball	·	5.2 km	MPC · JPL
106097	2000 TC_{2}	—	October 4, 2000	Desert Beaver	W. K. Y. Yeung	·	6.5 km	MPC · JPL
106098	2000 TC_{5}	—	October 1, 2000	Socorro	LINEAR	KOR	2.4 km	MPC · JPL
106099	2000 TF_{7}	—	October 1, 2000	Socorro	LINEAR	·	4.1 km	MPC · JPL
106100	2000 TX_{9}	—	October 1, 2000	Socorro	LINEAR	·	3.6 km	MPC · JPL

== 106101–106200 ==
back to top

Designation			Discovery			Properties		Ref
Permanent	Provisional	Named after	Date	Site	Discoverer(s)	Category	Diam.	Ref
106101	2000 TT_{12}	—	October 1, 2000	Socorro	LINEAR	·	4.8 km	MPC · JPL
106102	2000 TE_{13}	—	October 1, 2000	Socorro	LINEAR	·	4.0 km	MPC · JPL
106103	2000 TM_{13}	—	October 1, 2000	Socorro	LINEAR	·	3.6 km	MPC · JPL
106104	2000 TZ_{15}	—	October 1, 2000	Socorro	LINEAR	·	1.2 km	MPC · JPL
106105	2000 TW_{16}	—	October 1, 2000	Socorro	LINEAR	·	3.5 km	MPC · JPL
106106	2000 TG_{18}	—	October 1, 2000	Socorro	LINEAR	·	1.6 km	MPC · JPL
106107	2000 TC_{19}	—	October 1, 2000	Socorro	LINEAR	·	1.8 km	MPC · JPL
106108	2000 TF_{19}	—	October 1, 2000	Socorro	LINEAR	·	4.2 km	MPC · JPL
106109	2000 TV_{21}	—	October 1, 2000	Socorro	LINEAR	·	3.2 km	MPC · JPL
106110	2000 TW_{21}	—	October 1, 2000	Socorro	LINEAR	·	1.3 km	MPC · JPL
106111	2000 TS_{22}	—	October 4, 2000	Socorro	LINEAR	H	1.3 km	MPC · JPL
106112	2000 TT_{23}	—	October 1, 2000	Socorro	LINEAR	AST	2.6 km	MPC · JPL
106113	2000 TF_{25}	—	October 2, 2000	Socorro	LINEAR	·	10 km	MPC · JPL
106114	2000 TC_{27}	—	October 2, 2000	Socorro	LINEAR	·	4.0 km	MPC · JPL
106115	2000 TU_{27}	—	October 3, 2000	Socorro	LINEAR	KOR	2.8 km	MPC · JPL
106116	2000 TP_{28}	—	October 4, 2000	Socorro	LINEAR	·	3.5 km	MPC · JPL
106117	2000 TH_{29}	—	October 3, 2000	Socorro	LINEAR	EOS	5.6 km	MPC · JPL
106118	2000 TT_{32}	—	October 1, 2000	Socorro	LINEAR	·	6.2 km	MPC · JPL
106119	2000 TZ_{32}	—	October 4, 2000	Socorro	LINEAR	(7605)	10 km	MPC · JPL
106120	2000 TM_{33}	—	October 4, 2000	Socorro	LINEAR	H	1.5 km	MPC · JPL
106121	2000 TP_{33}	—	October 4, 2000	Socorro	LINEAR	H	2.0 km	MPC · JPL
106122	2000 TE_{34}	—	October 7, 2000	Desert Beaver	W. K. Y. Yeung	·	1.9 km	MPC · JPL
106123	2000 TK_{35}	—	October 6, 2000	Anderson Mesa	LONEOS	·	5.2 km	MPC · JPL
106124	2000 TL_{35}	—	October 6, 2000	Anderson Mesa	LONEOS	THM	3.8 km	MPC · JPL
106125	2000 TS_{35}	—	October 6, 2000	Anderson Mesa	LONEOS	·	3.0 km	MPC · JPL
106126	2000 TH_{36}	—	October 6, 2000	Anderson Mesa	LONEOS	·	4.0 km	MPC · JPL
106127	2000 TM_{36}	—	October 6, 2000	Anderson Mesa	LONEOS	·	4.5 km	MPC · JPL
106128	2000 TR_{37}	—	October 1, 2000	Socorro	LINEAR	·	2.3 km	MPC · JPL
106129	2000 TM_{38}	—	October 1, 2000	Socorro	LINEAR	EOS	3.9 km	MPC · JPL
106130	2000 TC_{39}	—	October 1, 2000	Socorro	LINEAR	·	6.3 km	MPC · JPL
106131	2000 TO_{39}	—	October 1, 2000	Socorro	LINEAR	fast	4.0 km	MPC · JPL
106132	2000 TT_{40}	—	October 1, 2000	Socorro	LINEAR	·	5.7 km	MPC · JPL
106133	2000 TA_{41}	—	October 1, 2000	Socorro	LINEAR	·	1.5 km	MPC · JPL
106134	2000 TZ_{41}	—	October 1, 2000	Socorro	LINEAR	·	6.2 km	MPC · JPL
106135	2000 TE_{42}	—	October 1, 2000	Socorro	LINEAR	·	3.7 km	MPC · JPL
106136	2000 TH_{42}	—	October 1, 2000	Socorro	LINEAR	EOS	4.0 km	MPC · JPL
106137	2000 TC_{43}	—	October 1, 2000	Socorro	LINEAR	·	4.0 km	MPC · JPL
106138	2000 TO_{43}	—	October 1, 2000	Socorro	LINEAR	·	7.9 km	MPC · JPL
106139	2000 TQ_{43}	—	October 1, 2000	Socorro	LINEAR	·	3.4 km	MPC · JPL
106140	2000 TP_{44}	—	October 1, 2000	Socorro	LINEAR	MAR	2.2 km	MPC · JPL
106141	2000 TQ_{44}	—	October 1, 2000	Socorro	LINEAR	TEL	2.7 km	MPC · JPL
106142	2000 TT_{44}	—	October 1, 2000	Socorro	LINEAR	·	1.4 km	MPC · JPL
106143	2000 TU_{44}	—	October 1, 2000	Socorro	LINEAR	L5	20 km	MPC · JPL
106144	2000 TL_{46}	—	October 1, 2000	Anderson Mesa	LONEOS	·	4.6 km	MPC · JPL
106145	2000 TQ_{49}	—	October 1, 2000	Socorro	LINEAR	·	5.1 km	MPC · JPL
106146	2000 TU_{50}	—	October 1, 2000	Socorro	LINEAR	AEG	7.4 km	MPC · JPL
106147	2000 TB_{51}	—	October 1, 2000	Socorro	LINEAR	·	7.7 km	MPC · JPL
106148	2000 TH_{51}	—	October 1, 2000	Socorro	LINEAR	·	2.0 km	MPC · JPL
106149	2000 TN_{51}	—	October 1, 2000	Socorro	LINEAR	·	2.7 km	MPC · JPL
106150	2000 TF_{54}	—	October 1, 2000	Socorro	LINEAR	THM	3.3 km	MPC · JPL
106151	2000 TR_{56}	—	October 2, 2000	Socorro	LINEAR	·	1.2 km	MPC · JPL
106152	2000 TZ_{56}	—	October 2, 2000	Anderson Mesa	LONEOS	·	5.6 km	MPC · JPL
106153	2000 TM_{57}	—	October 2, 2000	Anderson Mesa	LONEOS	·	4.6 km	MPC · JPL
106154	2000 TV_{58}	—	October 2, 2000	Anderson Mesa	LONEOS	EOS	2.9 km	MPC · JPL
106155	2000 TB_{59}	—	October 2, 2000	Anderson Mesa	LONEOS	·	5.2 km	MPC · JPL
106156	2000 TU_{59}	—	October 2, 2000	Anderson Mesa	LONEOS	·	6.1 km	MPC · JPL
106157	2000 TJ_{60}	—	October 2, 2000	Anderson Mesa	LONEOS	·	7.1 km	MPC · JPL
106158	2000 TT_{60}	—	October 2, 2000	Anderson Mesa	LONEOS	·	5.1 km	MPC · JPL
106159	2000 TU_{60}	—	October 2, 2000	Anderson Mesa	LONEOS	·	4.2 km	MPC · JPL
106160	2000 TG_{61}	—	October 2, 2000	Anderson Mesa	LONEOS	L5	13 km	MPC · JPL
106161	2000 TQ_{62}	—	October 2, 2000	Socorro	LINEAR	·	4.2 km	MPC · JPL
106162	2000 TR_{62}	—	October 2, 2000	Socorro	LINEAR	·	970 m	MPC · JPL
106163	2000 TT_{64}	—	October 1, 2000	Anderson Mesa	LONEOS	EOS	4.3 km	MPC · JPL
106164	2000 TA_{65}	—	October 1, 2000	Socorro	LINEAR	KOR	2.4 km	MPC · JPL
106165	2000 TC_{65}	—	October 1, 2000	Socorro	LINEAR	·	3.5 km	MPC · JPL
106166	2000 TN_{66}	—	October 1, 2000	Socorro	LINEAR	·	4.5 km	MPC · JPL
106167	2000 TS_{66}	—	October 1, 2000	Kitt Peak	Spacewatch	HYG	7.0 km	MPC · JPL
106168	2000 TE_{67}	—	October 2, 2000	Socorro	LINEAR	HYG	9.0 km	MPC · JPL
106169	2000 TP_{67}	—	October 2, 2000	Socorro	LINEAR	·	2.1 km	MPC · JPL
106170	2000 TF_{68}	—	October 6, 2000	Anderson Mesa	LONEOS	·	7.0 km	MPC · JPL
106171	2000 TT_{70}	—	October 5, 2000	Socorro	LINEAR	·	6.7 km	MPC · JPL
106172	2000 UF	—	October 19, 2000	Ondřejov	L. Kotková	EOS	5.4 km	MPC · JPL
106173	2000 UX_{2}	—	October 22, 2000	Bergisch Gladbach	W. Bickel	·	1.7 km	MPC · JPL
106174	2000 UX_{3}	—	October 24, 2000	Socorro	LINEAR	V	1.5 km	MPC · JPL
106175	2000 UL_{5}	—	October 24, 2000	Socorro	LINEAR	·	2.6 km	MPC · JPL
106176	2000 UQ_{5}	—	October 24, 2000	Socorro	LINEAR	·	5.9 km	MPC · JPL
106177	2000 UZ_{5}	—	October 24, 2000	Socorro	LINEAR	H	1.2 km	MPC · JPL
106178	2000 UA_{6}	—	October 25, 2000	Socorro	LINEAR	·	1.7 km	MPC · JPL
106179	2000 UD_{6}	—	October 24, 2000	Socorro	LINEAR	KOR	2.8 km	MPC · JPL
106180	2000 UL_{6}	—	October 24, 2000	Socorro	LINEAR	·	6.8 km	MPC · JPL
106181	2000 UY_{6}	—	October 24, 2000	Socorro	LINEAR	·	7.2 km	MPC · JPL
106182	2000 UF_{7}	—	October 24, 2000	Socorro	LINEAR	·	5.3 km	MPC · JPL
106183	2000 US_{8}	—	October 24, 2000	Socorro	LINEAR	·	3.2 km	MPC · JPL
106184	2000 UG_{9}	—	October 24, 2000	Socorro	LINEAR	·	1.4 km	MPC · JPL
106185	2000 UP_{9}	—	October 24, 2000	Socorro	LINEAR	·	9.3 km	MPC · JPL
106186	2000 US_{9}	—	October 24, 2000	Socorro	LINEAR	·	8.5 km	MPC · JPL
106187	2000 UY_{9}	—	October 24, 2000	Socorro	LINEAR	·	1.4 km	MPC · JPL
106188	2000 UZ_{10}	—	October 25, 2000	Socorro	LINEAR	·	1.8 km	MPC · JPL
106189	2000 UM_{11}	—	October 26, 2000	Fountain Hills	C. W. Juels	H	1.8 km	MPC · JPL
106190	2000 UH_{12}	—	October 24, 2000	Socorro	LINEAR	·	2.4 km	MPC · JPL
106191	2000 UL_{12}	—	October 24, 2000	Socorro	LINEAR	·	7.1 km	MPC · JPL
106192	2000 UP_{12}	—	October 25, 2000	Socorro	LINEAR	·	3.4 km	MPC · JPL
106193	2000 UU_{14}	—	October 25, 2000	Socorro	LINEAR	·	5.4 km	MPC · JPL
106194	2000 UF_{15}	—	October 25, 2000	Socorro	LINEAR	·	2.3 km	MPC · JPL
106195	2000 UM_{15}	—	October 29, 2000	Ondřejov	P. Kušnirák	EOS · fast	4.6 km	MPC · JPL
106196	2000 UF_{16}	—	October 29, 2000	Socorro	LINEAR	H	1.2 km	MPC · JPL
106197	2000 UO_{17}	—	October 24, 2000	Socorro	LINEAR	·	6.6 km	MPC · JPL
106198	2000 UQ_{18}	—	October 25, 2000	Socorro	LINEAR	·	5.4 km	MPC · JPL
106199	2000 UR_{18}	—	October 25, 2000	Socorro	LINEAR	·	7.1 km	MPC · JPL
106200	2000 UA_{19}	—	October 27, 2000	Socorro	LINEAR	·	5.1 km	MPC · JPL

== 106201–106300 ==
back to top

Designation			Discovery			Properties		Ref
Permanent	Provisional	Named after	Date	Site	Discoverer(s)	Category	Diam.	Ref
106201	2000 UR_{21}	—	October 24, 2000	Socorro	LINEAR	·	8.2 km	MPC · JPL
106202	2000 UE_{22}	—	October 24, 2000	Socorro	LINEAR	·	1.6 km	MPC · JPL
106203	2000 UB_{23}	—	October 24, 2000	Socorro	LINEAR	NYS	2.6 km	MPC · JPL
106204	2000 UP_{27}	—	October 24, 2000	Socorro	LINEAR	·	1.6 km	MPC · JPL
106205	2000 UY_{28}	—	October 29, 2000	Kitt Peak	Spacewatch	·	3.7 km	MPC · JPL
106206	2000 UR_{29}	—	October 24, 2000	Socorro	LINEAR	·	2.2 km	MPC · JPL
106207	2000 UU_{29}	—	October 25, 2000	Socorro	LINEAR	PHO	1.8 km	MPC · JPL
106208	2000 UW_{30}	—	October 26, 2000	Xinglong	SCAP	THM	8.1 km	MPC · JPL
106209	2000 UQ_{31}	—	October 29, 2000	Kitt Peak	Spacewatch	THM	4.5 km	MPC · JPL
106210	2000 UA_{32}	—	October 29, 2000	Kitt Peak	Spacewatch	·	4.6 km	MPC · JPL
106211	2000 UR_{32}	—	October 29, 2000	Kitt Peak	Spacewatch	·	2.6 km	MPC · JPL
106212	2000 UJ_{33}	—	October 29, 2000	Kitt Peak	Spacewatch	·	1.4 km	MPC · JPL
106213	2000 UU_{33}	—	October 24, 2000	Socorro	LINEAR	·	1.8 km	MPC · JPL
106214	2000 UZ_{34}	—	October 24, 2000	Socorro	LINEAR	·	6.2 km	MPC · JPL
106215	2000 UD_{35}	—	October 24, 2000	Socorro	LINEAR	·	1.1 km	MPC · JPL
106216	2000 US_{35}	—	October 24, 2000	Socorro	LINEAR	THM	7.2 km	MPC · JPL
106217	2000 UT_{35}	—	October 24, 2000	Socorro	LINEAR	·	3.9 km	MPC · JPL
106218	2000 UV_{35}	—	October 24, 2000	Socorro	LINEAR	NYS	2.4 km	MPC · JPL
106219	2000 UC_{36}	—	October 24, 2000	Socorro	LINEAR	·	1.6 km	MPC · JPL
106220	2000 UD_{37}	—	October 24, 2000	Socorro	LINEAR	·	2.0 km	MPC · JPL
106221	2000 UA_{38}	—	October 24, 2000	Socorro	LINEAR	NYS	2.5 km	MPC · JPL
106222	2000 UN_{38}	—	October 24, 2000	Socorro	LINEAR	·	7.0 km	MPC · JPL
106223	2000 UX_{38}	—	October 24, 2000	Socorro	LINEAR	HYG	6.1 km	MPC · JPL
106224	2000 UA_{39}	—	October 24, 2000	Socorro	LINEAR	·	1.2 km	MPC · JPL
106225	2000 UN_{39}	—	October 24, 2000	Socorro	LINEAR	KOR	3.0 km	MPC · JPL
106226	2000 US_{39}	—	October 24, 2000	Socorro	LINEAR	EMA	8.6 km	MPC · JPL
106227	2000 UA_{40}	—	October 24, 2000	Socorro	LINEAR	·	2.1 km	MPC · JPL
106228	2000 UB_{40}	—	October 24, 2000	Socorro	LINEAR	·	5.8 km	MPC · JPL
106229	2000 UM_{40}	—	October 24, 2000	Socorro	LINEAR	·	6.3 km	MPC · JPL
106230	2000 UB_{41}	—	October 24, 2000	Socorro	LINEAR	·	9.9 km	MPC · JPL
106231	2000 UL_{41}	—	October 24, 2000	Socorro	LINEAR	THM	6.1 km	MPC · JPL
106232	2000 UK_{42}	—	October 24, 2000	Socorro	LINEAR	·	2.0 km	MPC · JPL
106233	2000 UP_{43}	—	October 24, 2000	Socorro	LINEAR	·	1.3 km	MPC · JPL
106234	2000 UJ_{44}	—	October 24, 2000	Socorro	LINEAR	HYG	8.3 km	MPC · JPL
106235	2000 UP_{44}	—	October 24, 2000	Socorro	LINEAR	THM	5.4 km	MPC · JPL
106236	2000 UN_{45}	—	October 24, 2000	Socorro	LINEAR	·	5.3 km	MPC · JPL
106237	2000 UU_{45}	—	October 24, 2000	Socorro	LINEAR	NYS	1.7 km	MPC · JPL
106238	2000 UW_{45}	—	October 24, 2000	Socorro	LINEAR	THM	3.7 km	MPC · JPL
106239	2000 UM_{46}	—	October 24, 2000	Socorro	LINEAR	·	1.8 km	MPC · JPL
106240	2000 UB_{47}	—	October 24, 2000	Socorro	LINEAR	·	7.9 km	MPC · JPL
106241	2000 UC_{47}	—	October 24, 2000	Socorro	LINEAR	EOS	3.6 km	MPC · JPL
106242	2000 UL_{47}	—	October 24, 2000	Socorro	LINEAR	·	4.5 km	MPC · JPL
106243	2000 UX_{47}	—	October 24, 2000	Socorro	LINEAR	·	1.6 km	MPC · JPL
106244	2000 UX_{48}	—	October 24, 2000	Socorro	LINEAR	·	3.6 km	MPC · JPL
106245	2000 UZ_{48}	—	October 24, 2000	Socorro	LINEAR	·	1.5 km	MPC · JPL
106246	2000 UF_{50}	—	October 24, 2000	Socorro	LINEAR	·	3.3 km	MPC · JPL
106247	2000 UA_{51}	—	October 24, 2000	Socorro	LINEAR	EOS	3.6 km	MPC · JPL
106248	2000 UO_{51}	—	October 24, 2000	Socorro	LINEAR	·	5.2 km	MPC · JPL
106249	2000 UK_{52}	—	October 24, 2000	Socorro	LINEAR	·	6.0 km	MPC · JPL
106250	2000 UM_{52}	—	October 24, 2000	Socorro	LINEAR	·	1.7 km	MPC · JPL
106251	2000 UA_{54}	—	October 24, 2000	Socorro	LINEAR	·	7.3 km	MPC · JPL
106252	2000 UV_{54}	—	October 24, 2000	Socorro	LINEAR	·	1.3 km	MPC · JPL
106253	2000 UE_{56}	—	October 24, 2000	Socorro	LINEAR	·	1.7 km	MPC · JPL
106254	2000 UU_{56}	—	October 25, 2000	Socorro	LINEAR	·	4.1 km	MPC · JPL
106255	2000 UE_{57}	—	October 25, 2000	Socorro	LINEAR	·	3.3 km	MPC · JPL
106256	2000 UK_{57}	—	October 25, 2000	Socorro	LINEAR	·	5.2 km	MPC · JPL
106257	2000 UJ_{58}	—	October 25, 2000	Socorro	LINEAR	·	1.4 km	MPC · JPL
106258	2000 UN_{59}	—	October 25, 2000	Socorro	LINEAR	·	6.5 km	MPC · JPL
106259	2000 UX_{59}	—	October 25, 2000	Socorro	LINEAR	·	3.3 km	MPC · JPL
106260	2000 UC_{60}	—	October 25, 2000	Socorro	LINEAR	·	6.9 km	MPC · JPL
106261	2000 UD_{60}	—	October 25, 2000	Socorro	LINEAR	·	3.5 km	MPC · JPL
106262	2000 UZ_{60}	—	October 25, 2000	Socorro	LINEAR	·	4.4 km	MPC · JPL
106263	2000 UG_{62}	—	October 25, 2000	Socorro	LINEAR	·	1.0 km	MPC · JPL
106264	2000 UP_{62}	—	October 25, 2000	Socorro	LINEAR	·	5.2 km	MPC · JPL
106265	2000 UX_{62}	—	October 25, 2000	Socorro	LINEAR	·	2.4 km	MPC · JPL
106266	2000 UA_{63}	—	October 25, 2000	Socorro	LINEAR	·	6.4 km	MPC · JPL
106267	2000 UZ_{63}	—	October 25, 2000	Socorro	LINEAR	·	8.1 km	MPC · JPL
106268	2000 UD_{64}	—	October 25, 2000	Socorro	LINEAR	·	5.0 km	MPC · JPL
106269	2000 UW_{64}	—	October 25, 2000	Socorro	LINEAR	·	1.3 km	MPC · JPL
106270	2000 UK_{66}	—	October 25, 2000	Socorro	LINEAR	·	2.4 km	MPC · JPL
106271	2000 UO_{67}	—	October 25, 2000	Socorro	LINEAR	·	4.5 km	MPC · JPL
106272	2000 UP_{67}	—	October 25, 2000	Socorro	LINEAR	·	6.8 km	MPC · JPL
106273	2000 UB_{68}	—	October 25, 2000	Socorro	LINEAR	EOS	3.4 km	MPC · JPL
106274	2000 UU_{69}	—	October 25, 2000	Socorro	LINEAR	·	3.3 km	MPC · JPL
106275	2000 UY_{69}	—	October 25, 2000	Socorro	LINEAR	·	2.4 km	MPC · JPL
106276	2000 UB_{70}	—	October 25, 2000	Socorro	LINEAR	HYG	4.7 km	MPC · JPL
106277	2000 UA_{71}	—	October 25, 2000	Socorro	LINEAR	·	2.9 km	MPC · JPL
106278	2000 UZ_{71}	—	October 25, 2000	Socorro	LINEAR	HYG	6.8 km	MPC · JPL
106279	2000 UN_{72}	—	October 25, 2000	Socorro	LINEAR	·	5.3 km	MPC · JPL
106280	2000 UQ_{72}	—	October 25, 2000	Socorro	LINEAR	·	4.3 km	MPC · JPL
106281	2000 UW_{73}	—	October 26, 2000	Socorro	LINEAR	·	3.6 km	MPC · JPL
106282	2000 UP_{74}	—	October 30, 2000	Socorro	LINEAR	HYG	5.4 km	MPC · JPL
106283	2000 UZ_{74}	—	October 31, 2000	Socorro	LINEAR	·	3.3 km	MPC · JPL
106284	2000 UG_{76}	—	October 29, 2000	Socorro	LINEAR	H	1.2 km	MPC · JPL
106285	2000 UG_{77}	—	October 24, 2000	Socorro	LINEAR	EOS	3.5 km	MPC · JPL
106286	2000 UK_{77}	—	October 24, 2000	Socorro	LINEAR	·	2.2 km	MPC · JPL
106287	2000 UP_{77}	—	October 24, 2000	Socorro	LINEAR	NYS	2.0 km	MPC · JPL
106288	2000 UK_{78}	—	October 24, 2000	Socorro	LINEAR	·	1.8 km	MPC · JPL
106289	2000 UY_{78}	—	October 24, 2000	Socorro	LINEAR	·	1.5 km	MPC · JPL
106290	2000 UR_{79}	—	October 24, 2000	Socorro	LINEAR	·	8.1 km	MPC · JPL
106291	2000 UW_{79}	—	October 24, 2000	Socorro	LINEAR	V	1.5 km	MPC · JPL
106292	2000 UM_{80}	—	October 24, 2000	Socorro	LINEAR	·	1.8 km	MPC · JPL
106293	2000 US_{81}	—	October 24, 2000	Socorro	LINEAR	·	6.7 km	MPC · JPL
106294	2000 UH_{82}	—	October 26, 2000	Socorro	LINEAR	·	3.8 km	MPC · JPL
106295	2000 UJ_{82}	—	October 26, 2000	Socorro	LINEAR	MAS	1.7 km	MPC · JPL
106296	2000 UE_{83}	—	October 30, 2000	Socorro	LINEAR	·	2.5 km	MPC · JPL
106297	2000 UQ_{83}	—	October 31, 2000	Socorro	LINEAR	·	8.4 km	MPC · JPL
106298	2000 UX_{83}	—	October 31, 2000	Socorro	LINEAR	EOS	4.8 km	MPC · JPL
106299	2000 UJ_{84}	—	October 31, 2000	Socorro	LINEAR	EOS	5.1 km	MPC · JPL
106300	2000 UX_{84}	—	October 31, 2000	Socorro	LINEAR	NYS	2.1 km	MPC · JPL

== 106301–106400 ==
back to top

Designation			Discovery			Properties		Ref
Permanent	Provisional	Named after	Date	Site	Discoverer(s)	Category	Diam.	Ref
106301	2000 UJ_{86}	—	October 31, 2000	Socorro	LINEAR	·	8.7 km	MPC · JPL
106302	2000 UJ_{87}	—	October 31, 2000	Socorro	LINEAR	·	6.9 km	MPC · JPL
106303	2000 UO_{87}	—	October 31, 2000	Socorro	LINEAR	fast	4.3 km	MPC · JPL
106304	2000 UO_{88}	—	October 31, 2000	Socorro	LINEAR	·	6.8 km	MPC · JPL
106305	2000 UD_{90}	—	October 24, 2000	Socorro	LINEAR	·	1.7 km	MPC · JPL
106306	2000 UU_{91}	—	October 25, 2000	Socorro	LINEAR	·	5.0 km	MPC · JPL
106307	2000 UD_{92}	—	October 25, 2000	Socorro	LINEAR	·	5.2 km	MPC · JPL
106308	2000 UN_{92}	—	October 25, 2000	Socorro	LINEAR	·	1.4 km	MPC · JPL
106309	2000 UU_{92}	—	October 25, 2000	Socorro	LINEAR	·	4.8 km	MPC · JPL
106310	2000 UX_{92}	—	October 25, 2000	Socorro	LINEAR	·	4.8 km	MPC · JPL
106311	2000 UL_{93}	—	October 25, 2000	Socorro	LINEAR	·	4.1 km	MPC · JPL
106312	2000 UC_{94}	—	October 25, 2000	Socorro	LINEAR	·	4.5 km	MPC · JPL
106313	2000 UE_{94}	—	October 25, 2000	Socorro	LINEAR	·	4.8 km	MPC · JPL
106314	2000 UJ_{94}	—	October 25, 2000	Socorro	LINEAR	EOS	4.3 km	MPC · JPL
106315	2000 UP_{94}	—	October 25, 2000	Socorro	LINEAR	·	8.9 km	MPC · JPL
106316	2000 UA_{96}	—	October 25, 2000	Socorro	LINEAR	EOS	4.3 km	MPC · JPL
106317	2000 UK_{96}	—	October 25, 2000	Socorro	LINEAR	EOS	4.3 km	MPC · JPL
106318	2000 UP_{97}	—	October 25, 2000	Socorro	LINEAR	·	8.4 km	MPC · JPL
106319	2000 UD_{98}	—	October 25, 2000	Socorro	LINEAR	·	5.8 km	MPC · JPL
106320	2000 UN_{98}	—	October 25, 2000	Socorro	LINEAR	HYG	4.9 km	MPC · JPL
106321	2000 US_{98}	—	October 25, 2000	Socorro	LINEAR	·	1.5 km	MPC · JPL
106322	2000 UQ_{99}	—	October 25, 2000	Socorro	LINEAR	·	1.5 km	MPC · JPL
106323	2000 UD_{100}	—	October 25, 2000	Socorro	LINEAR	·	6.5 km	MPC · JPL
106324	2000 UD_{101}	—	October 25, 2000	Socorro	LINEAR	·	4.4 km	MPC · JPL
106325	2000 UE_{101}	—	October 25, 2000	Socorro	LINEAR	·	5.8 km	MPC · JPL
106326	2000 UN_{101}	—	October 25, 2000	Socorro	LINEAR	·	5.1 km	MPC · JPL
106327	2000 UF_{102}	—	October 25, 2000	Socorro	LINEAR	·	5.7 km	MPC · JPL
106328	2000 UV_{102}	—	October 25, 2000	Socorro	LINEAR	HYG	5.7 km	MPC · JPL
106329	2000 UL_{104}	—	October 25, 2000	Socorro	LINEAR	·	2.4 km	MPC · JPL
106330	2000 UU_{104}	—	October 25, 2000	Socorro	LINEAR	TIR · fast	4.5 km	MPC · JPL
106331	2000 UW_{105}	—	October 29, 2000	Socorro	LINEAR	·	5.8 km	MPC · JPL
106332	2000 UO_{106}	—	October 30, 2000	Socorro	LINEAR	(2076)	1.5 km	MPC · JPL
106333	2000 UC_{107}	—	October 30, 2000	Socorro	LINEAR	·	5.0 km	MPC · JPL
106334	2000 UM_{107}	—	October 30, 2000	Socorro	LINEAR	·	5.8 km	MPC · JPL
106335	2000 UV_{107}	—	October 30, 2000	Socorro	LINEAR	·	1.3 km	MPC · JPL
106336	2000 UW_{107}	—	October 30, 2000	Socorro	LINEAR	·	2.5 km	MPC · JPL
106337	2000 UZ_{107}	—	October 30, 2000	Socorro	LINEAR	V	1.6 km	MPC · JPL
106338	2000 UE_{108}	—	October 30, 2000	Socorro	LINEAR	·	4.8 km	MPC · JPL
106339	2000 UT_{108}	—	October 31, 2000	Socorro	LINEAR	·	5.3 km	MPC · JPL
106340	2000 UV_{108}	—	October 31, 2000	Socorro	LINEAR	·	2.1 km	MPC · JPL
106341	2000 UZ_{108}	—	October 31, 2000	Socorro	LINEAR	·	5.4 km	MPC · JPL
106342	2000 UP_{110}	—	October 31, 2000	Socorro	LINEAR	·	2.0 km	MPC · JPL
106343	2000 UT_{110}	—	October 25, 2000	Socorro	LINEAR	H	1.2 km	MPC · JPL
106344	2000 UC_{111}	—	October 26, 2000	Kitt Peak	Spacewatch	·	4.7 km	MPC · JPL
106345	2000 UQ_{111}	—	October 29, 2000	Kitt Peak	Spacewatch	·	2.0 km	MPC · JPL
106346	2000 UA_{112}	—	October 29, 2000	Kitt Peak	Spacewatch	·	4.4 km	MPC · JPL
106347	2000 UG_{112}	—	October 31, 2000	Socorro	LINEAR	·	4.8 km	MPC · JPL
106348	2000 UJ_{112}	—	October 25, 2000	Socorro	LINEAR	MAS	1.4 km	MPC · JPL
106349	2000 VE	—	November 1, 2000	Desert Beaver	W. K. Y. Yeung	·	1.8 km	MPC · JPL
106350	2000 VM_{1}	—	November 1, 2000	Socorro	LINEAR	·	3.2 km	MPC · JPL
106351	2000 VH_{2}	—	November 1, 2000	Socorro	LINEAR	PHO	3.7 km	MPC · JPL
106352	2000 VA_{3}	—	November 1, 2000	Kitt Peak	Spacewatch	·	1.3 km	MPC · JPL
106353	2000 VX_{3}	—	November 1, 2000	Socorro	LINEAR	·	4.3 km	MPC · JPL
106354	2000 VD_{4}	—	November 1, 2000	Socorro	LINEAR	·	5.1 km	MPC · JPL
106355	2000 VS_{4}	—	November 1, 2000	Socorro	LINEAR	NYS	2.1 km	MPC · JPL
106356	2000 VX_{4}	—	November 1, 2000	Socorro	LINEAR	·	4.8 km	MPC · JPL
106357	2000 VD_{5}	—	November 1, 2000	Socorro	LINEAR	fast	5.6 km	MPC · JPL
106358	2000 VE_{5}	—	November 1, 2000	Socorro	LINEAR	·	4.4 km	MPC · JPL
106359	2000 VP_{6}	—	November 1, 2000	Socorro	LINEAR	·	5.7 km	MPC · JPL
106360	2000 VB_{7}	—	November 1, 2000	Socorro	LINEAR	·	6.9 km	MPC · JPL
106361	2000 VK_{7}	—	November 1, 2000	Socorro	LINEAR	VER	9.1 km	MPC · JPL
106362	2000 VB_{8}	—	November 1, 2000	Socorro	LINEAR	·	4.1 km	MPC · JPL
106363	2000 VE_{8}	—	November 1, 2000	Socorro	LINEAR	THM	6.1 km	MPC · JPL
106364	2000 VO_{8}	—	November 1, 2000	Socorro	LINEAR	KOR	2.8 km	MPC · JPL
106365	2000 VS_{8}	—	November 1, 2000	Socorro	LINEAR	·	4.9 km	MPC · JPL
106366	2000 VM_{9}	—	November 1, 2000	Socorro	LINEAR	·	1.8 km	MPC · JPL
106367	2000 VQ_{9}	—	November 1, 2000	Socorro	LINEAR	MAS	1.2 km	MPC · JPL
106368	2000 VZ_{9}	—	November 1, 2000	Socorro	LINEAR	·	3.4 km	MPC · JPL
106369	2000 VE_{10}	—	November 1, 2000	Socorro	LINEAR	·	4.4 km	MPC · JPL
106370	2000 VT_{10}	—	November 1, 2000	Socorro	LINEAR	(2076)	1.4 km	MPC · JPL
106371	2000 VA_{11}	—	November 1, 2000	Socorro	LINEAR	HYG	5.2 km	MPC · JPL
106372	2000 VJ_{11}	—	November 1, 2000	Socorro	LINEAR	THM	4.8 km	MPC · JPL
106373	2000 VP_{11}	—	November 1, 2000	Socorro	LINEAR	fast	6.3 km	MPC · JPL
106374	2000 VQ_{11}	—	November 1, 2000	Socorro	LINEAR	·	2.4 km	MPC · JPL
106375	2000 VT_{13}	—	November 1, 2000	Socorro	LINEAR	·	6.2 km	MPC · JPL
106376	2000 VW_{13}	—	November 1, 2000	Socorro	LINEAR	·	5.9 km	MPC · JPL
106377	2000 VY_{13}	—	November 1, 2000	Socorro	LINEAR	·	1.1 km	MPC · JPL
106378	2000 VG_{14}	—	November 1, 2000	Socorro	LINEAR	·	6.5 km	MPC · JPL
106379	2000 VL_{14}	—	November 1, 2000	Socorro	LINEAR	VER	8.1 km	MPC · JPL
106380	2000 VE_{15}	—	November 1, 2000	Socorro	LINEAR	·	1.4 km	MPC · JPL
106381	2000 VB_{16}	—	November 1, 2000	Socorro	LINEAR	·	5.3 km	MPC · JPL
106382	2000 VF_{16}	—	November 1, 2000	Socorro	LINEAR	·	3.9 km	MPC · JPL
106383	2000 VG_{16}	—	November 1, 2000	Socorro	LINEAR	·	3.5 km	MPC · JPL
106384	2000 VQ_{16}	—	November 1, 2000	Socorro	LINEAR	·	2.0 km	MPC · JPL
106385	2000 VH_{17}	—	November 1, 2000	Socorro	LINEAR	·	2.3 km	MPC · JPL
106386	2000 VP_{17}	—	November 1, 2000	Socorro	LINEAR	·	2.2 km	MPC · JPL
106387	2000 VR_{17}	—	November 1, 2000	Socorro	LINEAR	·	1.7 km	MPC · JPL
106388	2000 VV_{17}	—	November 1, 2000	Socorro	LINEAR	·	6.4 km	MPC · JPL
106389	2000 VN_{20}	—	November 1, 2000	Socorro	LINEAR	·	7.9 km	MPC · JPL
106390	2000 VR_{20}	—	November 1, 2000	Socorro	LINEAR	EOS	2.9 km	MPC · JPL
106391	2000 VZ_{21}	—	November 1, 2000	Socorro	LINEAR	·	1.5 km	MPC · JPL
106392	2000 VB_{22}	—	November 1, 2000	Socorro	LINEAR	·	6.3 km	MPC · JPL
106393	2000 VW_{22}	—	November 1, 2000	Socorro	LINEAR	·	6.7 km	MPC · JPL
106394	2000 VG_{24}	—	November 1, 2000	Socorro	LINEAR	·	5.4 km	MPC · JPL
106395	2000 VL_{24}	—	November 1, 2000	Socorro	LINEAR	·	1.6 km	MPC · JPL
106396	2000 VQ_{24}	—	November 1, 2000	Socorro	LINEAR	NYS	2.6 km	MPC · JPL
106397	2000 VO_{25}	—	November 1, 2000	Socorro	LINEAR	·	1.2 km	MPC · JPL
106398	2000 VP_{25}	—	November 1, 2000	Socorro	LINEAR	·	3.5 km	MPC · JPL
106399	2000 VS_{25}	—	November 1, 2000	Socorro	LINEAR	·	6.1 km	MPC · JPL
106400	2000 VO_{27}	—	November 1, 2000	Socorro	LINEAR	·	1.8 km	MPC · JPL

== 106401–106500 ==
back to top

Designation			Discovery			Properties		Ref
Permanent	Provisional	Named after	Date	Site	Discoverer(s)	Category	Diam.	Ref
106401	2000 VB_{28}	—	November 1, 2000	Socorro	LINEAR	·	2.4 km	MPC · JPL
106402	2000 VD_{28}	—	November 1, 2000	Socorro	LINEAR	(2076)	1.6 km	MPC · JPL
106403	2000 VN_{28}	—	November 1, 2000	Socorro	LINEAR	NYS	2.2 km	MPC · JPL
106404	2000 VV_{28}	—	November 1, 2000	Socorro	LINEAR	·	2.0 km	MPC · JPL
106405	2000 VJ_{29}	—	November 1, 2000	Socorro	LINEAR	·	5.6 km	MPC · JPL
106406	2000 VM_{29}	—	November 1, 2000	Socorro	LINEAR	·	2.6 km	MPC · JPL
106407	2000 VN_{29}	—	November 1, 2000	Socorro	LINEAR	·	3.1 km	MPC · JPL
106408	2000 VK_{30}	—	November 1, 2000	Socorro	LINEAR	EOS	4.5 km	MPC · JPL
106409	2000 VE_{31}	—	November 1, 2000	Socorro	LINEAR	·	1.4 km	MPC · JPL
106410	2000 VJ_{31}	—	November 1, 2000	Socorro	LINEAR	NYS	2.4 km	MPC · JPL
106411	2000 VK_{31}	—	November 1, 2000	Socorro	LINEAR	·	1.5 km	MPC · JPL
106412	2000 VL_{31}	—	November 1, 2000	Socorro	LINEAR	·	1.2 km	MPC · JPL
106413	2000 VD_{32}	—	November 1, 2000	Socorro	LINEAR	·	5.5 km	MPC · JPL
106414	2000 VM_{32}	—	November 1, 2000	Socorro	LINEAR	·	9.7 km	MPC · JPL
106415	2000 VR_{32}	—	November 1, 2000	Socorro	LINEAR	HYG	9.3 km	MPC · JPL
106416	2000 VC_{34}	—	November 1, 2000	Socorro	LINEAR	HYG	7.3 km	MPC · JPL
106417	2000 VC_{35}	—	November 1, 2000	Socorro	LINEAR	H	1.3 km	MPC · JPL
106418	2000 VU_{35}	—	November 1, 2000	Socorro	LINEAR	·	2.2 km	MPC · JPL
106419	2000 VO_{37}	—	November 1, 2000	Socorro	LINEAR	·	5.2 km	MPC · JPL
106420	2000 VC_{38}	—	November 1, 2000	Socorro	LINEAR	·	2.2 km	MPC · JPL
106421	2000 VE_{38}	—	November 1, 2000	Xinglong	SCAP	·	1.8 km	MPC · JPL
106422	2000 VC_{42}	—	November 1, 2000	Socorro	LINEAR	·	1.3 km	MPC · JPL
106423	2000 VH_{42}	—	November 1, 2000	Socorro	LINEAR	·	2.3 km	MPC · JPL
106424	2000 VN_{42}	—	November 1, 2000	Socorro	LINEAR	·	2.3 km	MPC · JPL
106425	2000 VU_{42}	—	November 1, 2000	Socorro	LINEAR	·	5.4 km	MPC · JPL
106426	2000 VN_{43}	—	November 1, 2000	Socorro	LINEAR	·	3.9 km	MPC · JPL
106427	2000 VT_{43}	—	November 1, 2000	Socorro	LINEAR	HYG	5.2 km	MPC · JPL
106428	2000 VV_{43}	—	November 1, 2000	Socorro	LINEAR	EOS	4.1 km	MPC · JPL
106429	2000 VZ_{43}	—	November 1, 2000	Socorro	LINEAR	·	7.3 km	MPC · JPL
106430	2000 VN_{45}	—	November 2, 2000	Socorro	LINEAR	KOR	2.9 km	MPC · JPL
106431	2000 VU_{45}	—	November 2, 2000	Socorro	LINEAR	·	1.6 km	MPC · JPL
106432	2000 VB_{48}	—	November 2, 2000	Socorro	LINEAR	EOS	3.8 km	MPC · JPL
106433	2000 VM_{48}	—	November 2, 2000	Socorro	LINEAR	·	1.1 km	MPC · JPL
106434	2000 VV_{49}	—	November 2, 2000	Socorro	LINEAR	·	1.9 km	MPC · JPL
106435	2000 VM_{50}	—	November 2, 2000	Socorro	LINEAR	·	9.0 km	MPC · JPL
106436	2000 VB_{51}	—	November 3, 2000	Socorro	LINEAR	·	7.6 km	MPC · JPL
106437	2000 VL_{51}	—	November 3, 2000	Socorro	LINEAR	·	1.5 km	MPC · JPL
106438	2000 VK_{52}	—	November 3, 2000	Socorro	LINEAR	·	8.5 km	MPC · JPL
106439	2000 VL_{52}	—	November 3, 2000	Socorro	LINEAR	·	1.3 km	MPC · JPL
106440	2000 VM_{52}	—	November 3, 2000	Socorro	LINEAR	EOS	3.9 km	MPC · JPL
106441	2000 VA_{53}	—	November 3, 2000	Socorro	LINEAR	MAR	2.2 km	MPC · JPL
106442	2000 VL_{54}	—	November 3, 2000	Socorro	LINEAR	·	1.4 km	MPC · JPL
106443	2000 VN_{54}	—	November 3, 2000	Socorro	LINEAR	HYG	5.0 km	MPC · JPL
106444	2000 VP_{54}	—	November 3, 2000	Socorro	LINEAR	EOS	3.5 km	MPC · JPL
106445	2000 VN_{55}	—	November 3, 2000	Socorro	LINEAR	·	1.6 km	MPC · JPL
106446	2000 VT_{55}	—	November 3, 2000	Socorro	LINEAR	·	2.5 km	MPC · JPL
106447	2000 VA_{56}	—	November 3, 2000	Socorro	LINEAR	·	5.6 km	MPC · JPL
106448	2000 VN_{56}	—	November 3, 2000	Socorro	LINEAR	·	1.4 km	MPC · JPL
106449	2000 VU_{56}	—	November 3, 2000	Socorro	LINEAR	·	5.3 km	MPC · JPL
106450	2000 VJ_{57}	—	November 3, 2000	Socorro	LINEAR	·	5.2 km	MPC · JPL
106451	2000 VX_{57}	—	November 3, 2000	Socorro	LINEAR	·	1.7 km	MPC · JPL
106452	2000 VJ_{59}	—	November 6, 2000	Socorro	LINEAR	·	7.8 km	MPC · JPL
106453	2000 VC_{60}	—	November 1, 2000	Socorro	LINEAR	·	6.3 km	MPC · JPL
106454	2000 VJ_{60}	—	November 1, 2000	Kitt Peak	Spacewatch	·	5.2 km	MPC · JPL
106455	2000 VJ_{62}	—	November 9, 2000	Socorro	LINEAR	H	1.1 km	MPC · JPL
106456	2000 VW_{62}	—	November 3, 2000	Socorro	LINEAR	V	1.2 km	MPC · JPL
106457	2000 WC	—	November 16, 2000	Kitt Peak	Spacewatch	·	2.4 km	MPC · JPL
106458	2000 WT_{2}	—	November 17, 2000	Socorro	LINEAR	H	1.3 km	MPC · JPL
106459	2000 WD_{3}	—	November 19, 2000	Socorro	LINEAR	H	1.2 km	MPC · JPL
106460	2000 WV_{3}	—	November 19, 2000	Socorro	LINEAR	·	3.6 km	MPC · JPL
106461	2000 WZ_{3}	—	November 19, 2000	Socorro	LINEAR	·	9.9 km	MPC · JPL
106462	2000 WP_{4}	—	November 19, 2000	Socorro	LINEAR	EOS	3.8 km	MPC · JPL
106463	2000 WR_{4}	—	November 19, 2000	Socorro	LINEAR	·	4.7 km	MPC · JPL
106464	2000 WU_{4}	—	November 19, 2000	Socorro	LINEAR	·	6.7 km	MPC · JPL
106465	2000 WZ_{4}	—	November 19, 2000	Socorro	LINEAR	H	1.2 km	MPC · JPL
106466	2000 WF_{7}	—	November 20, 2000	Socorro	LINEAR	ERI	2.5 km	MPC · JPL
106467	2000 WJ_{7}	—	November 20, 2000	Socorro	LINEAR	V	960 m	MPC · JPL
106468	2000 WO_{7}	—	November 20, 2000	Socorro	LINEAR	·	1.8 km	MPC · JPL
106469	2000 WR_{8}	—	November 20, 2000	Socorro	LINEAR	·	4.4 km	MPC · JPL
106470	2000 WU_{9}	—	November 21, 2000	Farpoint	G. Hug	·	1.8 km	MPC · JPL
106471	2000 WJ_{11}	—	November 24, 2000	Elmira	Cecce, A. J.	V	1.5 km	MPC · JPL
106472	2000 WK_{12}	—	November 22, 2000	Haleakala	NEAT	·	4.4 km	MPC · JPL
106473	2000 WV_{13}	—	November 20, 2000	Socorro	LINEAR	·	4.8 km	MPC · JPL
106474	2000 WZ_{13}	—	November 20, 2000	Socorro	LINEAR	·	1.6 km	MPC · JPL
106475	2000 WF_{14}	—	November 20, 2000	Socorro	LINEAR	·	2.0 km	MPC · JPL
106476	2000 WU_{15}	—	November 21, 2000	Socorro	LINEAR	·	3.5 km	MPC · JPL
106477	2000 WZ_{16}	—	November 21, 2000	Socorro	LINEAR	ADE	3.6 km	MPC · JPL
106478	2000 WH_{18}	—	November 21, 2000	Socorro	LINEAR	·	1.5 km	MPC · JPL
106479	2000 WP_{18}	—	November 21, 2000	Socorro	LINEAR	·	1.7 km	MPC · JPL
106480	2000 WX_{18}	—	November 21, 2000	Socorro	LINEAR	·	2.0 km	MPC · JPL
106481	2000 WD_{19}	—	November 25, 2000	Fountain Hills	C. W. Juels	·	7.7 km	MPC · JPL
106482	2000 WA_{22}	—	November 20, 2000	Socorro	LINEAR	·	1.1 km	MPC · JPL
106483	2000 WF_{22}	—	November 20, 2000	Socorro	LINEAR	·	9.1 km	MPC · JPL
106484	2000 WV_{22}	—	November 20, 2000	Socorro	LINEAR	·	1.4 km	MPC · JPL
106485	2000 WU_{23}	—	November 20, 2000	Socorro	LINEAR	·	8.8 km	MPC · JPL
106486	2000 WG_{24}	—	November 20, 2000	Socorro	LINEAR	HYG	6.1 km	MPC · JPL
106487	2000 WH_{24}	—	November 20, 2000	Socorro	LINEAR	EOS	4.2 km	MPC · JPL
106488	2000 WY_{24}	—	November 20, 2000	Socorro	LINEAR	·	1.4 km	MPC · JPL
106489	2000 WA_{25}	—	November 20, 2000	Socorro	LINEAR	EUN	2.9 km	MPC · JPL
106490	2000 WB_{26}	—	November 21, 2000	Socorro	LINEAR	·	7.2 km	MPC · JPL
106491	2000 WG_{28}	—	November 23, 2000	Haleakala	NEAT	TIR	6.3 km	MPC · JPL
106492	2000 WJ_{28}	—	November 23, 2000	Haleakala	NEAT	VER	6.7 km	MPC · JPL
106493	2000 WM_{29}	—	November 21, 2000	Socorro	LINEAR	PHO	2.4 km	MPC · JPL
106494	2000 WL_{30}	—	November 20, 2000	Socorro	LINEAR	·	5.7 km	MPC · JPL
106495	2000 WD_{31}	—	November 20, 2000	Socorro	LINEAR	·	5.3 km	MPC · JPL
106496	2000 WK_{31}	—	November 20, 2000	Socorro	LINEAR	·	6.8 km	MPC · JPL
106497	2000 WO_{31}	—	November 20, 2000	Socorro	LINEAR	EOS	4.9 km	MPC · JPL
106498	2000 WD_{33}	—	November 20, 2000	Socorro	LINEAR	·	6.0 km	MPC · JPL
106499	2000 WE_{33}	—	November 20, 2000	Socorro	LINEAR	·	7.8 km	MPC · JPL
106500	2000 WW_{34}	—	November 20, 2000	Socorro	LINEAR	·	2.5 km	MPC · JPL

== 106501–106600 ==
back to top

Designation			Discovery			Properties		Ref
Permanent	Provisional	Named after	Date	Site	Discoverer(s)	Category	Diam.	Ref
106501	2000 WN_{36}	—	November 20, 2000	Socorro	LINEAR	·	1.5 km	MPC · JPL
106502	2000 WO_{36}	—	November 20, 2000	Socorro	LINEAR	·	5.1 km	MPC · JPL
106503	2000 WS_{36}	—	November 20, 2000	Socorro	LINEAR	·	2.5 km	MPC · JPL
106504	2000 WT_{36}	—	November 20, 2000	Socorro	LINEAR	·	5.6 km	MPC · JPL
106505	2000 WY_{36}	—	November 20, 2000	Socorro	LINEAR	·	3.0 km	MPC · JPL
106506	2000 WS_{38}	—	November 20, 2000	Socorro	LINEAR	·	7.1 km	MPC · JPL
106507	2000 WO_{39}	—	November 20, 2000	Socorro	LINEAR	·	1.6 km	MPC · JPL
106508	2000 WR_{39}	—	November 20, 2000	Socorro	LINEAR	·	6.4 km	MPC · JPL
106509	2000 WM_{41}	—	November 20, 2000	Socorro	LINEAR	·	2.1 km	MPC · JPL
106510	2000 WN_{41}	—	November 20, 2000	Socorro	LINEAR	V	1.4 km	MPC · JPL
106511	2000 WK_{42}	—	November 21, 2000	Socorro	LINEAR	·	6.6 km	MPC · JPL
106512	2000 WP_{42}	—	November 21, 2000	Socorro	LINEAR	·	1.2 km	MPC · JPL
106513	2000 WH_{43}	—	November 21, 2000	Socorro	LINEAR	·	11 km	MPC · JPL
106514	2000 WN_{44}	—	November 21, 2000	Socorro	LINEAR	EOS	4.2 km	MPC · JPL
106515	2000 WS_{44}	—	November 21, 2000	Socorro	LINEAR	·	1.3 km	MPC · JPL
106516	2000 WN_{45}	—	November 21, 2000	Socorro	LINEAR	·	5.1 km	MPC · JPL
106517	2000 WQ_{45}	—	November 21, 2000	Socorro	LINEAR	·	4.2 km	MPC · JPL
106518	2000 WR_{49}	—	November 25, 2000	Socorro	LINEAR	TIR	5.9 km	MPC · JPL
106519	2000 WY_{49}	—	November 25, 2000	Socorro	LINEAR	·	1.5 km	MPC · JPL
106520	2000 WA_{51}	—	November 21, 2000	Socorro	LINEAR	·	2.0 km	MPC · JPL
106521	2000 WC_{51}	—	November 26, 2000	Socorro	LINEAR	·	2.4 km	MPC · JPL
106522	2000 WM_{53}	—	November 27, 2000	Kitt Peak	Spacewatch	·	1.5 km	MPC · JPL
106523	2000 WE_{55}	—	November 20, 2000	Socorro	LINEAR	PHO	3.6 km	MPC · JPL
106524	2000 WJ_{55}	—	November 20, 2000	Socorro	LINEAR	V	1.6 km	MPC · JPL
106525	2000 WZ_{55}	—	November 20, 2000	Socorro	LINEAR	·	2.2 km	MPC · JPL
106526	2000 WN_{56}	—	November 21, 2000	Socorro	LINEAR	·	1.7 km	MPC · JPL
106527	2000 WW_{56}	—	November 21, 2000	Socorro	LINEAR	·	8.6 km	MPC · JPL
106528	2000 WA_{57}	—	November 21, 2000	Socorro	LINEAR	·	3.3 km	MPC · JPL
106529	2000 WZ_{57}	—	November 21, 2000	Socorro	LINEAR	·	2.5 km	MPC · JPL
106530	2000 WA_{58}	—	November 21, 2000	Socorro	LINEAR	·	1.5 km	MPC · JPL
106531	2000 WY_{58}	—	November 21, 2000	Socorro	LINEAR	·	6.2 km	MPC · JPL
106532	2000 WC_{59}	—	November 21, 2000	Socorro	LINEAR	·	2.6 km	MPC · JPL
106533	2000 WD_{60}	—	November 21, 2000	Socorro	LINEAR	·	2.1 km	MPC · JPL
106534	2000 WK_{60}	—	November 21, 2000	Socorro	LINEAR	·	1.3 km	MPC · JPL
106535	2000 WR_{62}	—	November 28, 2000	Fountain Hills	C. W. Juels	·	8.4 km	MPC · JPL
106536	2000 WV_{62}	—	November 28, 2000	Fountain Hills	C. W. Juels	·	5.8 km	MPC · JPL
106537 McCarthy	2000 WB_{63}	McCarthy	November 23, 2000	Junk Bond	J. Medkeff	V	1.2 km	MPC · JPL
106538	2000 WK_{63}	—	November 26, 2000	Socorro	LINEAR	APO +1km	2.0 km	MPC · JPL
106539	2000 WA_{66}	—	November 28, 2000	Prescott	P. G. Comba	·	3.3 km	MPC · JPL
106540	2000 WD_{66}	—	November 19, 2000	Socorro	LINEAR	H	1.5 km	MPC · JPL
106541	2000 WE_{66}	—	November 19, 2000	Socorro	LINEAR	H	1.4 km	MPC · JPL
106542	2000 WP_{66}	—	November 21, 2000	Socorro	LINEAR	·	2.5 km	MPC · JPL
106543	2000 WA_{67}	—	November 25, 2000	Socorro	LINEAR	H	1.2 km	MPC · JPL
106544	2000 WJ_{68}	—	November 27, 2000	Črni Vrh	Mikuž, H.	(2076)	2.4 km	MPC · JPL
106545 Colanduno	2000 WL_{68}	Colanduno	November 28, 2000	Junk Bond	J. Medkeff	·	5.0 km	MPC · JPL
106546	2000 WF_{69}	—	November 19, 2000	Socorro	LINEAR	HNS	3.4 km	MPC · JPL
106547	2000 WH_{69}	—	November 19, 2000	Socorro	LINEAR	·	2.6 km	MPC · JPL
106548	2000 WN_{69}	—	November 19, 2000	Socorro	LINEAR	VER	7.4 km	MPC · JPL
106549	2000 WS_{69}	—	November 19, 2000	Socorro	LINEAR	EOS	4.3 km	MPC · JPL
106550	2000 WG_{72}	—	November 19, 2000	Socorro	LINEAR	TIR	6.1 km	MPC · JPL
106551	2000 WT_{72}	—	November 20, 2000	Socorro	LINEAR	·	5.6 km	MPC · JPL
106552	2000 WW_{73}	—	November 20, 2000	Socorro	LINEAR	·	6.9 km	MPC · JPL
106553	2000 WP_{74}	—	November 20, 2000	Socorro	LINEAR	EOS	4.2 km	MPC · JPL
106554	2000 WM_{75}	—	November 20, 2000	Socorro	LINEAR	·	1.4 km	MPC · JPL
106555	2000 WX_{75}	—	November 20, 2000	Socorro	LINEAR	·	3.7 km	MPC · JPL
106556	2000 WC_{77}	—	November 20, 2000	Socorro	LINEAR	·	5.6 km	MPC · JPL
106557	2000 WJ_{77}	—	November 20, 2000	Socorro	LINEAR	·	2.6 km	MPC · JPL
106558	2000 WW_{80}	—	November 20, 2000	Socorro	LINEAR	·	2.4 km	MPC · JPL
106559	2000 WC_{81}	—	November 20, 2000	Socorro	LINEAR	·	2.5 km	MPC · JPL
106560	2000 WH_{82}	—	November 20, 2000	Socorro	LINEAR	EOS	5.1 km	MPC · JPL
106561	2000 WL_{83}	—	November 20, 2000	Socorro	LINEAR	·	2.1 km	MPC · JPL
106562	2000 WQ_{83}	—	November 20, 2000	Socorro	LINEAR	·	1.2 km	MPC · JPL
106563	2000 WR_{85}	—	November 20, 2000	Socorro	LINEAR	·	3.6 km	MPC · JPL
106564	2000 WY_{85}	—	November 20, 2000	Socorro	LINEAR	·	1.8 km	MPC · JPL
106565	2000 WE_{86}	—	November 20, 2000	Socorro	LINEAR	·	3.0 km	MPC · JPL
106566	2000 WJ_{88}	—	November 20, 2000	Socorro	LINEAR	·	2.0 km	MPC · JPL
106567	2000 WK_{88}	—	November 20, 2000	Socorro	LINEAR	·	3.4 km	MPC · JPL
106568	2000 WV_{88}	—	November 20, 2000	Socorro	LINEAR	ERI	3.1 km	MPC · JPL
106569	2000 WC_{89}	—	November 21, 2000	Socorro	LINEAR	·	4.3 km	MPC · JPL
106570	2000 WY_{89}	—	November 21, 2000	Socorro	LINEAR	·	3.1 km	MPC · JPL
106571	2000 WB_{90}	—	November 21, 2000	Socorro	LINEAR	HYG	5.9 km	MPC · JPL
106572	2000 WN_{90}	—	November 21, 2000	Socorro	LINEAR	·	1.4 km	MPC · JPL
106573	2000 WR_{90}	—	November 21, 2000	Socorro	LINEAR	·	4.4 km	MPC · JPL
106574	2000 WH_{94}	—	November 21, 2000	Socorro	LINEAR	·	2.2 km	MPC · JPL
106575	2000 WO_{94}	—	November 21, 2000	Socorro	LINEAR	HYG	6.4 km	MPC · JPL
106576	2000 WX_{94}	—	November 21, 2000	Socorro	LINEAR	·	1.8 km	MPC · JPL
106577	2000 WB_{95}	—	November 21, 2000	Socorro	LINEAR	·	1.4 km	MPC · JPL
106578	2000 WA_{97}	—	November 21, 2000	Socorro	LINEAR	·	1.6 km	MPC · JPL
106579	2000 WO_{98}	—	November 21, 2000	Socorro	LINEAR	·	2.3 km	MPC · JPL
106580	2000 WZ_{98}	—	November 21, 2000	Socorro	LINEAR	THM	5.1 km	MPC · JPL
106581	2000 WK_{100}	—	November 21, 2000	Socorro	LINEAR	V	1.3 km	MPC · JPL
106582	2000 WH_{101}	—	November 21, 2000	Socorro	LINEAR	·	1.5 km	MPC · JPL
106583	2000 WE_{102}	—	November 26, 2000	Socorro	LINEAR	·	6.0 km	MPC · JPL
106584	2000 WG_{104}	—	November 27, 2000	Socorro	LINEAR	·	1.3 km	MPC · JPL
106585	2000 WJ_{105}	—	November 27, 2000	Kitt Peak	Spacewatch	·	1.5 km	MPC · JPL
106586	2000 WL_{105}	—	November 27, 2000	Kitt Peak	Spacewatch	·	1.7 km	MPC · JPL
106587	2000 WH_{106}	—	November 25, 2000	Haleakala	NEAT	·	6.1 km	MPC · JPL
106588	2000 WW_{106}	—	November 20, 2000	Socorro	LINEAR	PHO	2.2 km	MPC · JPL
106589	2000 WN_{107}	—	November 29, 2000	Haleakala	NEAT	APO +1km · slow	2.2 km	MPC · JPL
106590	2000 WQ_{107}	—	November 20, 2000	Socorro	LINEAR	·	5.8 km	MPC · JPL
106591	2000 WF_{108}	—	November 20, 2000	Socorro	LINEAR	·	1.5 km	MPC · JPL
106592	2000 WM_{108}	—	November 20, 2000	Socorro	LINEAR	·	2.3 km	MPC · JPL
106593	2000 WO_{108}	—	November 20, 2000	Socorro	LINEAR	·	6.6 km	MPC · JPL
106594	2000 WW_{108}	—	November 20, 2000	Socorro	LINEAR	V	890 m	MPC · JPL
106595	2000 WT_{109}	—	November 20, 2000	Socorro	LINEAR	HYG	6.5 km	MPC · JPL
106596	2000 WE_{110}	—	November 20, 2000	Socorro	LINEAR	·	2.3 km	MPC · JPL
106597	2000 WG_{111}	—	November 20, 2000	Socorro	LINEAR	·	2.9 km	MPC · JPL
106598	2000 WZ_{112}	—	November 20, 2000	Socorro	LINEAR	·	2.2 km	MPC · JPL
106599	2000 WA_{113}	—	November 20, 2000	Socorro	LINEAR	V · slow	1.3 km	MPC · JPL
106600	2000 WX_{113}	—	November 20, 2000	Socorro	LINEAR	·	5.8 km	MPC · JPL

== 106601–106700 ==
back to top

Designation			Discovery			Properties		Ref
Permanent	Provisional	Named after	Date	Site	Discoverer(s)	Category	Diam.	Ref
106601	2000 WE_{114}	—	November 20, 2000	Socorro	LINEAR	·	1.5 km	MPC · JPL
106602	2000 WH_{114}	—	November 20, 2000	Socorro	LINEAR	·	1.9 km	MPC · JPL
106603	2000 WM_{114}	—	November 20, 2000	Socorro	LINEAR	NYS	2.4 km	MPC · JPL
106604	2000 WN_{114}	—	November 20, 2000	Socorro	LINEAR	·	1.5 km	MPC · JPL
106605	2000 WD_{115}	—	November 20, 2000	Socorro	LINEAR	V	1.9 km	MPC · JPL
106606	2000 WR_{115}	—	November 20, 2000	Socorro	LINEAR	·	3.0 km	MPC · JPL
106607	2000 WU_{115}	—	November 20, 2000	Socorro	LINEAR	·	1.9 km	MPC · JPL
106608	2000 WM_{116}	—	November 20, 2000	Socorro	LINEAR	·	1.9 km	MPC · JPL
106609	2000 WN_{116}	—	November 20, 2000	Socorro	LINEAR	·	1.4 km	MPC · JPL
106610	2000 WU_{116}	—	November 20, 2000	Socorro	LINEAR	·	1.5 km	MPC · JPL
106611	2000 WJ_{120}	—	November 20, 2000	Socorro	LINEAR	·	2.2 km	MPC · JPL
106612	2000 WR_{120}	—	November 20, 2000	Socorro	LINEAR	·	2.3 km	MPC · JPL
106613	2000 WN_{121}	—	November 26, 2000	Socorro	LINEAR	H	920 m	MPC · JPL
106614	2000 WQ_{121}	—	November 26, 2000	Socorro	LINEAR	·	1.6 km	MPC · JPL
106615	2000 WY_{121}	—	November 29, 2000	Socorro	LINEAR	·	1.2 km	MPC · JPL
106616	2000 WJ_{122}	—	November 29, 2000	Socorro	LINEAR	·	1.2 km	MPC · JPL
106617	2000 WB_{123}	—	November 29, 2000	Socorro	LINEAR	·	1.9 km	MPC · JPL
106618	2000 WJ_{123}	—	November 29, 2000	Socorro	LINEAR	·	3.6 km	MPC · JPL
106619	2000 WB_{124}	—	November 30, 2000	Kitt Peak	Spacewatch	(5)	2.2 km	MPC · JPL
106620	2000 WL_{124}	—	November 19, 2000	Socorro	LINEAR	H · slow	1.7 km	MPC · JPL
106621	2000 WM_{124}	—	November 19, 2000	Socorro	LINEAR	H	1.0 km	MPC · JPL
106622	2000 WP_{124}	—	November 19, 2000	Socorro	LINEAR	H	1.8 km	MPC · JPL
106623	2000 WT_{124}	—	November 30, 2000	Socorro	LINEAR	H	1.3 km	MPC · JPL
106624	2000 WV_{124}	—	November 27, 2000	Haleakala	NEAT	TIR	6.0 km	MPC · JPL
106625	2000 WC_{125}	—	November 21, 2000	Socorro	LINEAR	·	2.3 km	MPC · JPL
106626	2000 WE_{126}	—	November 30, 2000	Socorro	LINEAR	NYS	2.2 km	MPC · JPL
106627	2000 WG_{126}	—	November 30, 2000	Socorro	LINEAR	·	2.2 km	MPC · JPL
106628	2000 WH_{126}	—	November 30, 2000	Socorro	LINEAR	·	2.4 km	MPC · JPL
106629	2000 WY_{128}	—	November 19, 2000	Kitt Peak	Spacewatch	·	6.2 km	MPC · JPL
106630	2000 WF_{130}	—	November 19, 2000	Kitt Peak	Spacewatch	·	1.7 km	MPC · JPL
106631	2000 WX_{130}	—	November 20, 2000	Anderson Mesa	LONEOS	·	5.9 km	MPC · JPL
106632	2000 WH_{131}	—	November 20, 2000	Anderson Mesa	LONEOS	·	2.0 km	MPC · JPL
106633	2000 WP_{131}	—	November 20, 2000	Socorro	LINEAR	·	3.2 km	MPC · JPL
106634	2000 WY_{131}	—	November 30, 2000	Haleakala	NEAT	·	7.3 km	MPC · JPL
106635	2000 WL_{132}	—	November 19, 2000	Socorro	LINEAR	·	2.8 km	MPC · JPL
106636	2000 WQ_{132}	—	November 19, 2000	Socorro	LINEAR	·	7.2 km	MPC · JPL
106637	2000 WU_{132}	—	November 19, 2000	Socorro	LINEAR	·	8.7 km	MPC · JPL
106638	2000 WB_{133}	—	November 19, 2000	Socorro	LINEAR	·	5.0 km	MPC · JPL
106639	2000 WL_{133}	—	November 19, 2000	Socorro	LINEAR	·	7.1 km	MPC · JPL
106640	2000 WN_{133}	—	November 19, 2000	Socorro	LINEAR	·	2.8 km	MPC · JPL
106641	2000 WR_{133}	—	November 19, 2000	Socorro	LINEAR	·	1.4 km	MPC · JPL
106642	2000 WL_{134}	—	November 19, 2000	Socorro	LINEAR	·	5.9 km	MPC · JPL
106643	2000 WO_{134}	—	November 19, 2000	Socorro	LINEAR	·	3.6 km	MPC · JPL
106644	2000 WT_{134}	—	November 19, 2000	Socorro	LINEAR	·	5.3 km	MPC · JPL
106645	2000 WV_{134}	—	November 19, 2000	Socorro	LINEAR	EOS	5.1 km	MPC · JPL
106646	2000 WW_{134}	—	November 19, 2000	Socorro	LINEAR	V	1.2 km	MPC · JPL
106647	2000 WC_{135}	—	November 19, 2000	Socorro	LINEAR	slow?	1.7 km	MPC · JPL
106648	2000 WU_{135}	—	November 20, 2000	Anderson Mesa	LONEOS	·	4.9 km	MPC · JPL
106649	2000 WW_{135}	—	November 20, 2000	Socorro	LINEAR	·	1.3 km	MPC · JPL
106650	2000 WO_{136}	—	November 20, 2000	Socorro	LINEAR	·	1.2 km	MPC · JPL
106651	2000 WA_{137}	—	November 20, 2000	Socorro	LINEAR	·	1.1 km	MPC · JPL
106652	2000 WV_{140}	—	November 21, 2000	Socorro	LINEAR	THM	7.4 km	MPC · JPL
106653	2000 WW_{140}	—	November 21, 2000	Socorro	LINEAR	·	2.6 km	MPC · JPL
106654	2000 WA_{141}	—	November 21, 2000	Haleakala	NEAT	·	1.7 km	MPC · JPL
106655	2000 WP_{141}	—	November 19, 2000	Socorro	LINEAR	·	10 km	MPC · JPL
106656	2000 WE_{142}	—	November 20, 2000	Anderson Mesa	LONEOS	slow	2.6 km	MPC · JPL
106657	2000 WK_{142}	—	November 20, 2000	Anderson Mesa	LONEOS	·	8.0 km	MPC · JPL
106658	2000 WA_{143}	—	November 20, 2000	Anderson Mesa	LONEOS	·	6.2 km	MPC · JPL
106659	2000 WU_{143}	—	November 20, 2000	Socorro	LINEAR	·	3.1 km	MPC · JPL
106660	2000 WV_{143}	—	November 20, 2000	Socorro	LINEAR	NYS	2.3 km	MPC · JPL
106661	2000 WH_{144}	—	November 21, 2000	Haleakala	NEAT	·	6.5 km	MPC · JPL
106662	2000 WW_{144}	—	November 21, 2000	Socorro	LINEAR	·	5.1 km	MPC · JPL
106663	2000 WY_{144}	—	November 21, 2000	Socorro	LINEAR	NYS	2.4 km	MPC · JPL
106664	2000 WY_{145}	—	November 23, 2000	Haleakala	NEAT	·	6.9 km	MPC · JPL
106665	2000 WA_{146}	—	November 23, 2000	Haleakala	NEAT	EOS	4.6 km	MPC · JPL
106666	2000 WL_{146}	—	November 23, 2000	Haleakala	NEAT	·	8.0 km	MPC · JPL
106667	2000 WN_{146}	—	November 23, 2000	Haleakala	NEAT	·	5.1 km	MPC · JPL
106668	2000 WO_{146}	—	November 23, 2000	Haleakala	NEAT	·	7.4 km	MPC · JPL
106669	2000 WF_{147}	—	November 28, 2000	Haleakala	NEAT	EUP	6.9 km	MPC · JPL
106670	2000 WX_{149}	—	November 28, 2000	Kitt Peak	Spacewatch	NYS	1.5 km	MPC · JPL
106671	2000 WT_{150}	—	November 19, 2000	Socorro	LINEAR	H	1.3 km	MPC · JPL
106672	2000 WK_{151}	—	November 30, 2000	Socorro	LINEAR	H	1.3 km	MPC · JPL
106673	2000 WL_{151}	—	November 30, 2000	Socorro	LINEAR	H	1.2 km	MPC · JPL
106674	2000 WA_{152}	—	November 30, 2000	Haleakala	NEAT	EOS	4.9 km	MPC · JPL
106675	2000 WC_{152}	—	November 30, 2000	Haleakala	NEAT	·	7.0 km	MPC · JPL
106676	2000 WO_{152}	—	November 29, 2000	Socorro	LINEAR	EUP	10 km	MPC · JPL
106677	2000 WP_{152}	—	November 29, 2000	Socorro	LINEAR	·	4.3 km	MPC · JPL
106678	2000 WR_{152}	—	November 29, 2000	Socorro	LINEAR	EMA	7.3 km	MPC · JPL
106679	2000 WV_{152}	—	November 29, 2000	Socorro	LINEAR	·	1.3 km	MPC · JPL
106680	2000 WK_{153}	—	November 29, 2000	Socorro	LINEAR	·	1.6 km	MPC · JPL
106681	2000 WO_{153}	—	November 29, 2000	Socorro	LINEAR	·	2.6 km	MPC · JPL
106682	2000 WL_{154}	—	November 30, 2000	Socorro	LINEAR	EOS	5.0 km	MPC · JPL
106683	2000 WW_{154}	—	November 30, 2000	Socorro	LINEAR	·	4.1 km	MPC · JPL
106684	2000 WA_{155}	—	November 30, 2000	Socorro	LINEAR	·	8.2 km	MPC · JPL
106685	2000 WE_{156}	—	November 30, 2000	Socorro	LINEAR	·	7.8 km	MPC · JPL
106686	2000 WM_{156}	—	November 30, 2000	Socorro	LINEAR	·	1.6 km	MPC · JPL
106687	2000 WQ_{157}	—	November 30, 2000	Socorro	LINEAR	·	4.7 km	MPC · JPL
106688	2000 WS_{157}	—	November 30, 2000	Socorro	LINEAR	·	2.4 km	MPC · JPL
106689	2000 WW_{157}	—	November 30, 2000	Socorro	LINEAR	·	2.4 km	MPC · JPL
106690	2000 WK_{158}	—	November 30, 2000	Socorro	LINEAR	·	1.7 km	MPC · JPL
106691	2000 WW_{158}	—	November 30, 2000	Haleakala	NEAT	·	8.0 km	MPC · JPL
106692	2000 WF_{159}	—	November 30, 2000	Kitt Peak	Spacewatch	·	1.4 km	MPC · JPL
106693	2000 WT_{161}	—	November 20, 2000	Anderson Mesa	LONEOS	EOS	3.9 km	MPC · JPL
106694	2000 WV_{161}	—	November 20, 2000	Anderson Mesa	LONEOS	EOS ·	6.3 km	MPC · JPL
106695	2000 WP_{164}	—	November 22, 2000	Haleakala	NEAT	·	6.7 km	MPC · JPL
106696	2000 WT_{164}	—	November 22, 2000	Haleakala	NEAT	EOS	3.5 km	MPC · JPL
106697	2000 WA_{165}	—	November 22, 2000	Haleakala	NEAT	·	3.8 km	MPC · JPL
106698	2000 WO_{166}	—	November 24, 2000	Anderson Mesa	LONEOS	·	1.8 km	MPC · JPL
106699	2000 WA_{167}	—	November 24, 2000	Anderson Mesa	LONEOS	·	7.2 km	MPC · JPL
106700	2000 WX_{167}	—	November 24, 2000	Anderson Mesa	LONEOS	H	1.1 km	MPC · JPL

== 106701–106800 ==
back to top

Designation			Discovery			Properties		Ref
Permanent	Provisional	Named after	Date	Site	Discoverer(s)	Category	Diam.	Ref
106701	2000 WA_{168}	—	November 25, 2000	Socorro	LINEAR	·	4.7 km	MPC · JPL
106702	2000 WC_{168}	—	November 25, 2000	Socorro	LINEAR	·	5.6 km	MPC · JPL
106703	2000 WF_{168}	—	November 25, 2000	Socorro	LINEAR	·	5.7 km	MPC · JPL
106704	2000 WN_{168}	—	November 25, 2000	Anderson Mesa	LONEOS	PHO	2.0 km	MPC · JPL
106705	2000 WC_{169}	—	November 25, 2000	Anderson Mesa	LONEOS	·	3.1 km	MPC · JPL
106706	2000 WK_{169}	—	November 26, 2000	Socorro	LINEAR	·	7.8 km	MPC · JPL
106707	2000 WF_{170}	—	November 24, 2000	Anderson Mesa	LONEOS	(1298)	7.0 km	MPC · JPL
106708	2000 WJ_{170}	—	November 24, 2000	Anderson Mesa	LONEOS	EOS	3.6 km	MPC · JPL
106709	2000 WF_{171}	—	November 24, 2000	Kitt Peak	Spacewatch	(5)	4.1 km	MPC · JPL
106710	2000 WB_{172}	—	November 25, 2000	Socorro	LINEAR	·	6.1 km	MPC · JPL
106711	2000 WE_{173}	—	November 25, 2000	Anderson Mesa	LONEOS	·	2.2 km	MPC · JPL
106712	2000 WH_{173}	—	November 25, 2000	Anderson Mesa	LONEOS	·	1.5 km	MPC · JPL
106713	2000 WY_{173}	—	November 26, 2000	Socorro	LINEAR	·	5.2 km	MPC · JPL
106714	2000 WZ_{173}	—	November 26, 2000	Anderson Mesa	LONEOS	·	6.0 km	MPC · JPL
106715	2000 WJ_{174}	—	November 26, 2000	Socorro	LINEAR	VER	6.8 km	MPC · JPL
106716	2000 WN_{174}	—	November 26, 2000	Socorro	LINEAR	·	7.9 km	MPC · JPL
106717	2000 WQ_{174}	—	November 26, 2000	Socorro	LINEAR	·	5.1 km	MPC · JPL
106718	2000 WS_{174}	—	November 26, 2000	Socorro	LINEAR	·	6.2 km	MPC · JPL
106719	2000 WD_{175}	—	November 26, 2000	Socorro	LINEAR	TIR	6.8 km	MPC · JPL
106720	2000 WR_{175}	—	November 26, 2000	Socorro	LINEAR	·	6.8 km	MPC · JPL
106721	2000 WJ_{177}	—	November 27, 2000	Socorro	LINEAR	·	6.9 km	MPC · JPL
106722	2000 WA_{179}	—	November 25, 2000	Socorro	LINEAR	·	8.5 km	MPC · JPL
106723	2000 WE_{179}	—	November 26, 2000	Socorro	LINEAR	EOS · slow	5.5 km	MPC · JPL
106724	2000 WG_{179}	—	November 26, 2000	Socorro	LINEAR	·	4.1 km	MPC · JPL
106725	2000 WF_{180}	—	November 27, 2000	Socorro	LINEAR	EOS	3.3 km	MPC · JPL
106726	2000 WQ_{180}	—	November 28, 2000	Kitt Peak	Spacewatch	·	4.4 km	MPC · JPL
106727	2000 WT_{181}	—	November 25, 2000	Anderson Mesa	LONEOS	PHO	1.7 km	MPC · JPL
106728	2000 WR_{182}	—	November 20, 2000	Anderson Mesa	LONEOS	·	7.1 km	MPC · JPL
106729	2000 WS_{182}	—	November 20, 2000	Anderson Mesa	LONEOS	·	3.3 km	MPC · JPL
106730	2000 WA_{183}	—	November 17, 2000	Socorro	LINEAR	TIR	6.0 km	MPC · JPL
106731	2000 WW_{183}	—	November 30, 2000	Anderson Mesa	LONEOS	·	7.1 km	MPC · JPL
106732	2000 WE_{184}	—	November 30, 2000	Anderson Mesa	LONEOS	·	2.5 km	MPC · JPL
106733	2000 WQ_{184}	—	November 30, 2000	Kitt Peak	Spacewatch	NYS	3.0 km	MPC · JPL
106734	2000 WT_{184}	—	November 30, 2000	Kitt Peak	Spacewatch	·	1.4 km	MPC · JPL
106735	2000 WM_{185}	—	November 29, 2000	Socorro	LINEAR	·	2.1 km	MPC · JPL
106736	2000 WN_{185}	—	November 29, 2000	Socorro	LINEAR	·	2.3 km	MPC · JPL
106737	2000 WK_{186}	—	November 27, 2000	Socorro	LINEAR	PHO	2.9 km	MPC · JPL
106738	2000 WG_{187}	—	November 19, 2000	Anderson Mesa	LONEOS	HYG	5.7 km	MPC · JPL
106739	2000 WS_{187}	—	November 16, 2000	Anderson Mesa	LONEOS	·	3.8 km	MPC · JPL
106740	2000 WL_{188}	—	November 18, 2000	Anderson Mesa	LONEOS	·	4.4 km	MPC · JPL
106741	2000 WD_{189}	—	November 18, 2000	Anderson Mesa	LONEOS	VER	7.6 km	MPC · JPL
106742	2000 WQ_{189}	—	November 18, 2000	Anderson Mesa	LONEOS	(5)	2.1 km	MPC · JPL
106743	2000 WU_{189}	—	November 18, 2000	Anderson Mesa	LONEOS	·	5.2 km	MPC · JPL
106744	2000 WP_{190}	—	November 18, 2000	Anderson Mesa	LONEOS	·	2.5 km	MPC · JPL
106745	2000 WU_{191}	—	November 19, 2000	Anderson Mesa	LONEOS	·	3.4 km	MPC · JPL
106746	2000 WE_{192}	—	November 19, 2000	Anderson Mesa	LONEOS	EUN · slow	2.2 km	MPC · JPL
106747	2000 XD_{2}	—	December 1, 2000	Socorro	LINEAR	·	1.9 km	MPC · JPL
106748	2000 XG_{2}	—	December 3, 2000	Olathe	Robinson, L.	V	1.3 km	MPC · JPL
106749	2000 XS_{2}	—	December 1, 2000	Socorro	LINEAR	·	4.5 km	MPC · JPL
106750	2000 XR_{3}	—	December 1, 2000	Socorro	LINEAR	·	7.8 km	MPC · JPL
106751	2000 XL_{4}	—	December 1, 2000	Socorro	LINEAR	slow	4.7 km	MPC · JPL
106752	2000 XS_{4}	—	December 1, 2000	Socorro	LINEAR	·	8.6 km	MPC · JPL
106753	2000 XU_{4}	—	December 1, 2000	Socorro	LINEAR	·	5.5 km	MPC · JPL
106754	2000 XZ_{4}	—	December 1, 2000	Socorro	LINEAR	·	6.6 km	MPC · JPL
106755	2000 XF_{5}	—	December 1, 2000	Socorro	LINEAR	·	4.2 km	MPC · JPL
106756	2000 XS_{5}	—	December 1, 2000	Socorro	LINEAR	·	6.4 km	MPC · JPL
106757	2000 XW_{5}	—	December 1, 2000	Socorro	LINEAR	·	9.1 km	MPC · JPL
106758	2000 XK_{6}	—	December 1, 2000	Socorro	LINEAR	·	2.2 km	MPC · JPL
106759	2000 XT_{6}	—	December 1, 2000	Socorro	LINEAR	·	9.7 km	MPC · JPL
106760	2000 XD_{7}	—	December 1, 2000	Socorro	LINEAR	·	1.2 km	MPC · JPL
106761	2000 XW_{8}	—	December 1, 2000	Socorro	LINEAR	H	1.9 km	MPC · JPL
106762	2000 XU_{9}	—	December 1, 2000	Socorro	LINEAR	PHO	7.3 km	MPC · JPL
106763	2000 XK_{10}	—	December 1, 2000	Socorro	LINEAR	EUN	2.6 km	MPC · JPL
106764	2000 XG_{11}	—	December 1, 2000	Socorro	LINEAR	·	8.5 km	MPC · JPL
106765	2000 XW_{11}	—	December 4, 2000	Socorro	LINEAR	·	5.3 km	MPC · JPL
106766	2000 XB_{12}	—	December 4, 2000	Socorro	LINEAR	·	1.8 km	MPC · JPL
106767	2000 XW_{13}	—	December 4, 2000	Socorro	LINEAR	PHO	7.6 km	MPC · JPL
106768	2000 XG_{14}	—	December 1, 2000	Haleakala	NEAT	BAR	3.4 km	MPC · JPL
106769	2000 XA_{15}	—	December 5, 2000	Socorro	LINEAR	H	2.5 km	MPC · JPL
106770	2000 XD_{15}	—	December 5, 2000	Socorro	LINEAR	H	1.2 km	MPC · JPL
106771	2000 XE_{15}	—	December 5, 2000	Socorro	LINEAR	T_{j} (2.97)	9.0 km	MPC · JPL
106772	2000 XT_{15}	—	December 1, 2000	Socorro	LINEAR	·	7.8 km	MPC · JPL
106773	2000 XG_{16}	—	December 1, 2000	Socorro	LINEAR	·	8.3 km	MPC · JPL
106774	2000 XM_{16}	—	December 1, 2000	Socorro	LINEAR	EOS	3.6 km	MPC · JPL
106775	2000 XR_{16}	—	December 1, 2000	Socorro	LINEAR	PHO	3.3 km	MPC · JPL
106776	2000 XP_{18}	—	December 4, 2000	Socorro	LINEAR	·	8.4 km	MPC · JPL
106777	2000 XQ_{18}	—	December 4, 2000	Socorro	LINEAR	EOS	4.1 km	MPC · JPL
106778	2000 XL_{19}	—	December 4, 2000	Socorro	LINEAR	EOS	4.1 km	MPC · JPL
106779	2000 XP_{19}	—	December 4, 2000	Socorro	LINEAR	·	2.2 km	MPC · JPL
106780	2000 XW_{19}	—	December 4, 2000	Socorro	LINEAR	·	9.3 km	MPC · JPL
106781	2000 XU_{20}	—	December 4, 2000	Socorro	LINEAR	TIR	4.5 km	MPC · JPL
106782	2000 XB_{21}	—	December 4, 2000	Socorro	LINEAR	V	1.2 km	MPC · JPL
106783	2000 XJ_{21}	—	December 4, 2000	Socorro	LINEAR	EMA	7.8 km	MPC · JPL
106784	2000 XQ_{21}	—	December 4, 2000	Socorro	LINEAR	·	1.7 km	MPC · JPL
106785	2000 XU_{21}	—	December 4, 2000	Socorro	LINEAR	EOS	5.0 km	MPC · JPL
106786	2000 XZ_{21}	—	December 4, 2000	Socorro	LINEAR	·	9.1 km	MPC · JPL
106787	2000 XO_{22}	—	December 4, 2000	Socorro	LINEAR	·	1.3 km	MPC · JPL
106788	2000 XQ_{22}	—	December 4, 2000	Socorro	LINEAR	·	2.0 km	MPC · JPL
106789	2000 XZ_{22}	—	December 4, 2000	Socorro	LINEAR	·	4.6 km	MPC · JPL
106790	2000 XW_{23}	—	December 4, 2000	Socorro	LINEAR	·	1.4 km	MPC · JPL
106791	2000 XF_{24}	—	December 4, 2000	Socorro	LINEAR	EOS	6.6 km	MPC · JPL
106792	2000 XR_{24}	—	December 4, 2000	Socorro	LINEAR	·	6.7 km	MPC · JPL
106793	2000 XB_{26}	—	December 4, 2000	Socorro	LINEAR	·	5.3 km	MPC · JPL
106794	2000 XK_{26}	—	December 4, 2000	Socorro	LINEAR	ERI	3.8 km	MPC · JPL
106795	2000 XP_{26}	—	December 4, 2000	Socorro	LINEAR	·	1.7 km	MPC · JPL
106796	2000 XQ_{26}	—	December 4, 2000	Socorro	LINEAR	·	1.4 km	MPC · JPL
106797	2000 XX_{27}	—	December 4, 2000	Socorro	LINEAR	·	4.0 km	MPC · JPL
106798	2000 XN_{28}	—	December 4, 2000	Socorro	LINEAR	·	1.3 km	MPC · JPL
106799	2000 XD_{31}	—	December 4, 2000	Socorro	LINEAR	EOS	4.3 km	MPC · JPL
106800	2000 XN_{31}	—	December 4, 2000	Socorro	LINEAR	·	7.3 km	MPC · JPL

== 106801–106900 ==
back to top

Designation			Discovery			Properties		Ref
Permanent	Provisional	Named after	Date	Site	Discoverer(s)	Category	Diam.	Ref
106801	2000 XT_{31}	—	December 4, 2000	Socorro	LINEAR	·	7.0 km	MPC · JPL
106802	2000 XX_{32}	—	December 4, 2000	Socorro	LINEAR	·	4.6 km	MPC · JPL
106803	2000 XX_{33}	—	December 4, 2000	Socorro	LINEAR	·	2.9 km	MPC · JPL
106804	2000 XY_{33}	—	December 4, 2000	Socorro	LINEAR	·	1.7 km	MPC · JPL
106805	2000 XM_{35}	—	December 4, 2000	Socorro	LINEAR	·	2.7 km	MPC · JPL
106806	2000 XO_{35}	—	December 4, 2000	Socorro	LINEAR	·	4.6 km	MPC · JPL
106807	2000 XE_{37}	—	December 5, 2000	Socorro	LINEAR	·	8.0 km	MPC · JPL
106808	2000 XX_{38}	—	December 5, 2000	Socorro	LINEAR	H	1.3 km	MPC · JPL
106809	2000 XP_{39}	—	December 4, 2000	Socorro	LINEAR	·	4.0 km	MPC · JPL
106810	2000 XY_{39}	—	December 5, 2000	Socorro	LINEAR	MAR	4.2 km	MPC · JPL
106811	2000 XE_{40}	—	December 5, 2000	Socorro	LINEAR	·	6.4 km	MPC · JPL
106812	2000 XV_{40}	—	December 5, 2000	Socorro	LINEAR	TIR	8.0 km	MPC · JPL
106813	2000 XW_{41}	—	December 5, 2000	Socorro	LINEAR	·	4.4 km	MPC · JPL
106814	2000 XN_{42}	—	December 5, 2000	Socorro	LINEAR	TIR	4.4 km	MPC · JPL
106815	2000 XR_{42}	—	December 5, 2000	Socorro	LINEAR	H	990 m	MPC · JPL
106816	2000 XE_{43}	—	December 5, 2000	Socorro	LINEAR	TIR	4.5 km	MPC · JPL
106817 Yubangtaek	2000 XC_{44}	Yubangtaek	December 6, 2000	Bohyunsan	Jeon, Y.-B., Park, Y.-H.	·	3.9 km	MPC · JPL
106818	2000 XV_{44}	—	December 8, 2000	Socorro	LINEAR	·	12 km	MPC · JPL
106819	2000 XC_{45}	—	December 5, 2000	Socorro	LINEAR	H	1.2 km	MPC · JPL
106820	2000 XJ_{45}	—	December 7, 2000	Socorro	LINEAR	H	1.2 km	MPC · JPL
106821	2000 XX_{45}	—	December 15, 2000	Socorro	LINEAR	H	1.3 km	MPC · JPL
106822	2000 XN_{47}	—	December 4, 2000	Socorro	LINEAR	·	5.8 km	MPC · JPL
106823	2000 XB_{49}	—	December 4, 2000	Socorro	LINEAR	·	3.3 km	MPC · JPL
106824	2000 XJ_{51}	—	December 6, 2000	Socorro	LINEAR	·	7.0 km	MPC · JPL
106825	2000 XY_{53}	—	December 15, 2000	Uccle	T. Pauwels	MAS	1.7 km	MPC · JPL
106826	2000 YF	—	December 16, 2000	Socorro	LINEAR	H	960 m	MPC · JPL
106827	2000 YU	—	December 16, 2000	Socorro	LINEAR	TIR	3.3 km	MPC · JPL
106828	2000 YG_{1}	—	December 18, 2000	Kitt Peak	Spacewatch	·	1.8 km	MPC · JPL
106829	2000 YL_{1}	—	December 17, 2000	Socorro	LINEAR	H	1.3 km	MPC · JPL
106830	2000 YC_{4}	—	December 19, 2000	Višnjan Observatory	K. Korlević	·	2.2 km	MPC · JPL
106831	2000 YQ_{4}	—	December 20, 2000	Kitt Peak	Spacewatch	THM	2.9 km	MPC · JPL
106832	2000 YU_{6}	—	December 20, 2000	Socorro	LINEAR	·	3.1 km	MPC · JPL
106833	2000 YF_{7}	—	December 20, 2000	Socorro	LINEAR	NYS	2.3 km	MPC · JPL
106834	2000 YN_{7}	—	December 20, 2000	Socorro	LINEAR	·	1.7 km	MPC · JPL
106835	2000 YE_{8}	—	December 22, 2000	Višnjan Observatory	K. Korlević	NYS	3.2 km	MPC · JPL
106836	2000 YG_{8}	—	December 20, 2000	Oaxaca	Roe, J. M.	MAS	1.4 km	MPC · JPL
106837	2000 YW_{8}	—	December 20, 2000	Kitt Peak	Spacewatch	·	1.3 km	MPC · JPL
106838	2000 YT_{9}	—	December 23, 2000	Višnjan Observatory	K. Korlević	V	1.5 km	MPC · JPL
106839	2000 YJ_{10}	—	December 21, 2000	Socorro	LINEAR	·	2.5 km	MPC · JPL
106840	2000 YA_{11}	—	December 22, 2000	Socorro	LINEAR	KRM	5.0 km	MPC · JPL
106841	2000 YB_{11}	—	December 22, 2000	Socorro	LINEAR	·	4.2 km	MPC · JPL
106842	2000 YT_{12}	—	December 23, 2000	Desert Beaver	W. K. Y. Yeung	V	2.1 km	MPC · JPL
106843	2000 YV_{12}	—	December 25, 2000	Oizumi	T. Kobayashi	·	2.4 km	MPC · JPL
106844	2000 YQ_{14}	—	December 25, 2000	Oaxaca	Roe, J. M.	NYS	1.6 km	MPC · JPL
106845	2000 YR_{14}	—	December 24, 2000	Farpoint	G. Hug	·	1.9 km	MPC · JPL
106846	2000 YY_{15}	—	December 22, 2000	Anderson Mesa	LONEOS	·	2.8 km	MPC · JPL
106847	2000 YO_{16}	—	December 28, 2000	Ametlla de Mar	J. Nomen	·	5.4 km	MPC · JPL
106848	2000 YP_{16}	—	December 28, 2000	Socorro	LINEAR	fast	2.1 km	MPC · JPL
106849	2000 YC_{17}	—	December 22, 2000	Socorro	LINEAR	H	1.2 km	MPC · JPL
106850	2000 YN_{18}	—	December 21, 2000	Socorro	LINEAR	·	5.5 km	MPC · JPL
106851	2000 YS_{19}	—	December 28, 2000	Fair Oaks Ranch	J. V. McClusky	HNS	2.1 km	MPC · JPL
106852	2000 YV_{19}	—	December 22, 2000	Haleakala	NEAT	·	5.5 km	MPC · JPL
106853	2000 YZ_{19}	—	December 27, 2000	Desert Beaver	W. K. Y. Yeung	·	1.8 km	MPC · JPL
106854	2000 YB_{21}	—	December 28, 2000	Kitt Peak	Spacewatch	·	1.7 km	MPC · JPL
106855	2000 YN_{21}	—	December 26, 2000	Haleakala	NEAT	EUN	2.1 km	MPC · JPL
106856	2000 YF_{22}	—	December 26, 2000	Kitt Peak	Spacewatch	·	1.2 km	MPC · JPL
106857	2000 YU_{22}	—	December 28, 2000	Kitt Peak	Spacewatch	·	2.3 km	MPC · JPL
106858	2000 YT_{23}	—	December 28, 2000	Kitt Peak	Spacewatch	·	1.7 km	MPC · JPL
106859	2000 YC_{26}	—	December 23, 2000	Socorro	LINEAR	·	6.0 km	MPC · JPL
106860	2000 YO_{26}	—	December 28, 2000	Socorro	LINEAR	·	6.9 km	MPC · JPL
106861	2000 YV_{26}	—	December 28, 2000	Socorro	LINEAR	·	2.7 km	MPC · JPL
106862	2000 YZ_{26}	—	December 25, 2000	Haleakala	NEAT	·	2.9 km	MPC · JPL
106863	2000 YA_{27}	—	December 25, 2000	Haleakala	NEAT	·	2.4 km	MPC · JPL
106864	2000 YL_{27}	—	December 30, 2000	Kitt Peak	Spacewatch	·	2.4 km	MPC · JPL
106865	2000 YU_{27}	—	December 30, 2000	Kitt Peak	Spacewatch	NYS	1.8 km	MPC · JPL
106866	2000 YQ_{28}	—	December 28, 2000	Socorro	LINEAR	H	1.2 km	MPC · JPL
106867	2000 YR_{28}	—	December 28, 2000	Socorro	LINEAR	H	1.1 km	MPC · JPL
106868	2000 YK_{31}	—	December 31, 2000	Kitt Peak	Spacewatch	·	1.9 km	MPC · JPL
106869 Irinyi	2000 YY_{31}	Irinyi	December 31, 2000	Piszkéstető	K. Sárneczky, L. Kiss	·	2.1 km	MPC · JPL
106870	2000 YN_{32}	—	December 30, 2000	Socorro	LINEAR	·	2.1 km	MPC · JPL
106871	2000 YP_{32}	—	December 30, 2000	Socorro	LINEAR	PHO	2.0 km	MPC · JPL
106872	2000 YV_{32}	—	December 30, 2000	Socorro	LINEAR	·	1.9 km	MPC · JPL
106873	2000 YA_{33}	—	December 30, 2000	Socorro	LINEAR	·	4.1 km	MPC · JPL
106874	2000 YD_{33}	—	December 23, 2000	Črni Vrh	Skvarč, J.	·	6.1 km	MPC · JPL
106875	2000 YW_{33}	—	December 28, 2000	Socorro	LINEAR	·	2.9 km	MPC · JPL
106876	2000 YN_{34}	—	December 28, 2000	Socorro	LINEAR	·	2.7 km	MPC · JPL
106877	2000 YU_{34}	—	December 28, 2000	Socorro	LINEAR	NYS	3.0 km	MPC · JPL
106878	2000 YZ_{35}	—	December 30, 2000	Socorro	LINEAR	·	1.8 km	MPC · JPL
106879	2000 YA_{36}	—	December 30, 2000	Socorro	LINEAR	·	2.0 km	MPC · JPL
106880	2000 YM_{36}	—	December 30, 2000	Socorro	LINEAR	THB	6.1 km	MPC · JPL
106881	2000 YX_{36}	—	December 30, 2000	Socorro	LINEAR	·	1.9 km	MPC · JPL
106882	2000 YY_{36}	—	December 30, 2000	Socorro	LINEAR	(2076)	2.2 km	MPC · JPL
106883	2000 YJ_{37}	—	December 30, 2000	Socorro	LINEAR	·	2.6 km	MPC · JPL
106884	2000 YN_{37}	—	December 30, 2000	Socorro	LINEAR	NYS	2.1 km	MPC · JPL
106885	2000 YY_{37}	—	December 30, 2000	Socorro	LINEAR	·	2.4 km	MPC · JPL
106886	2000 YC_{38}	—	December 30, 2000	Socorro	LINEAR	·	5.0 km	MPC · JPL
106887	2000 YC_{39}	—	December 30, 2000	Socorro	LINEAR	(5)	3.1 km	MPC · JPL
106888	2000 YM_{39}	—	December 30, 2000	Socorro	LINEAR	·	1.6 km	MPC · JPL
106889	2000 YW_{39}	—	December 30, 2000	Socorro	LINEAR	NYS	2.3 km	MPC · JPL
106890	2000 YA_{40}	—	December 30, 2000	Socorro	LINEAR	V	1.4 km	MPC · JPL
106891	2000 YV_{40}	—	December 30, 2000	Socorro	LINEAR	·	7.4 km	MPC · JPL
106892	2000 YK_{41}	—	December 30, 2000	Socorro	LINEAR	·	1.5 km	MPC · JPL
106893	2000 YS_{41}	—	December 30, 2000	Socorro	LINEAR	·	2.5 km	MPC · JPL
106894	2000 YT_{41}	—	December 30, 2000	Socorro	LINEAR	·	1.9 km	MPC · JPL
106895	2000 YX_{41}	—	December 30, 2000	Socorro	LINEAR	MAS	2.0 km	MPC · JPL
106896	2000 YL_{43}	—	December 30, 2000	Socorro	LINEAR	·	2.4 km	MPC · JPL
106897	2000 YO_{43}	—	December 30, 2000	Socorro	LINEAR	NYS	2.5 km	MPC · JPL
106898	2000 YU_{43}	—	December 30, 2000	Socorro	LINEAR	NYS	2.1 km	MPC · JPL
106899	2000 YF_{44}	—	December 30, 2000	Socorro	LINEAR	·	1.7 km	MPC · JPL
106900	2000 YA_{45}	—	December 30, 2000	Socorro	LINEAR	V	1.5 km	MPC · JPL

== 106901–107000 ==
back to top

Designation			Discovery			Properties		Ref
Permanent	Provisional	Named after	Date	Site	Discoverer(s)	Category	Diam.	Ref
106901	2000 YB_{45}	—	December 30, 2000	Socorro	LINEAR	V	1.6 km	MPC · JPL
106902	2000 YJ_{45}	—	December 30, 2000	Socorro	LINEAR	·	2.2 km	MPC · JPL
106903	2000 YN_{45}	—	December 30, 2000	Socorro	LINEAR	EUN	2.3 km	MPC · JPL
106904	2000 YH_{46}	—	December 30, 2000	Socorro	LINEAR	·	2.1 km	MPC · JPL
106905	2000 YP_{46}	—	December 30, 2000	Socorro	LINEAR	·	1.6 km	MPC · JPL
106906	2000 YJ_{47}	—	December 30, 2000	Socorro	LINEAR	·	2.8 km	MPC · JPL
106907	2000 YZ_{47}	—	December 30, 2000	Socorro	LINEAR	NYS	2.2 km	MPC · JPL
106908	2000 YX_{48}	—	December 30, 2000	Socorro	LINEAR	·	4.4 km	MPC · JPL
106909	2000 YA_{49}	—	December 30, 2000	Socorro	LINEAR	THM	5.0 km	MPC · JPL
106910	2000 YF_{49}	—	December 30, 2000	Socorro	LINEAR	·	1.9 km	MPC · JPL
106911	2000 YH_{49}	—	December 30, 2000	Socorro	LINEAR	V	1.5 km	MPC · JPL
106912	2000 YN_{49}	—	December 30, 2000	Socorro	LINEAR	·	1.9 km	MPC · JPL
106913	2000 YF_{50}	—	December 30, 2000	Socorro	LINEAR	·	1.6 km	MPC · JPL
106914	2000 YO_{51}	—	December 30, 2000	Socorro	LINEAR	·	1.5 km	MPC · JPL
106915	2000 YX_{51}	—	December 30, 2000	Socorro	LINEAR	·	2.3 km	MPC · JPL
106916	2000 YS_{52}	—	December 30, 2000	Socorro	LINEAR	·	1.8 km	MPC · JPL
106917	2000 YT_{52}	—	December 30, 2000	Socorro	LINEAR	·	2.2 km	MPC · JPL
106918	2000 YZ_{52}	—	December 30, 2000	Socorro	LINEAR	CLA	2.9 km	MPC · JPL
106919	2000 YC_{53}	—	December 30, 2000	Socorro	LINEAR	CLA	4.2 km	MPC · JPL
106920	2000 YG_{54}	—	December 30, 2000	Socorro	LINEAR	·	2.4 km	MPC · JPL
106921	2000 YN_{54}	—	December 30, 2000	Socorro	LINEAR	·	1.4 km	MPC · JPL
106922	2000 YM_{55}	—	December 30, 2000	Socorro	LINEAR	·	2.7 km	MPC · JPL
106923	2000 YM_{57}	—	December 30, 2000	Socorro	LINEAR	NYS	1.7 km	MPC · JPL
106924	2000 YT_{57}	—	December 30, 2000	Socorro	LINEAR	NYS	1.8 km	MPC · JPL
106925	2000 YS_{58}	—	December 30, 2000	Socorro	LINEAR	·	2.5 km	MPC · JPL
106926	2000 YG_{61}	—	December 30, 2000	Socorro	LINEAR	NYS	1.7 km	MPC · JPL
106927	2000 YV_{61}	—	December 30, 2000	Socorro	LINEAR	MAS	1.3 km	MPC · JPL
106928	2000 YQ_{62}	—	December 30, 2000	Socorro	LINEAR	V	1.6 km	MPC · JPL
106929	2000 YV_{62}	—	December 30, 2000	Socorro	LINEAR	·	1.8 km	MPC · JPL
106930	2000 YY_{63}	—	December 30, 2000	Socorro	LINEAR	·	4.6 km	MPC · JPL
106931	2000 YC_{64}	—	December 30, 2000	Socorro	LINEAR	·	2.3 km	MPC · JPL
106932	2000 YN_{64}	—	December 30, 2000	Socorro	LINEAR	·	5.0 km	MPC · JPL
106933	2000 YY_{64}	—	December 29, 2000	Kitt Peak	Spacewatch	·	2.0 km	MPC · JPL
106934	2000 YJ_{65}	—	December 16, 2000	Kitt Peak	Spacewatch	·	5.0 km	MPC · JPL
106935	2000 YB_{66}	—	December 30, 2000	Socorro	LINEAR	·	3.0 km	MPC · JPL
106936	2000 YF_{66}	—	December 30, 2000	Kitt Peak	Spacewatch	BAP	1.7 km	MPC · JPL
106937	2000 YV_{66}	—	December 30, 2000	Kitt Peak	Spacewatch	·	2.4 km	MPC · JPL
106938	2000 YR_{69}	—	December 30, 2000	Socorro	LINEAR	·	2.2 km	MPC · JPL
106939	2000 YX_{69}	—	December 30, 2000	Socorro	LINEAR	·	3.0 km	MPC · JPL
106940	2000 YF_{70}	—	December 30, 2000	Socorro	LINEAR	·	2.0 km	MPC · JPL
106941	2000 YR_{70}	—	December 30, 2000	Socorro	LINEAR	NYS	1.6 km	MPC · JPL
106942	2000 YY_{70}	—	December 30, 2000	Socorro	LINEAR	THM	5.6 km	MPC · JPL
106943	2000 YX_{72}	—	December 30, 2000	Socorro	LINEAR	(5)	2.8 km	MPC · JPL
106944	2000 YA_{73}	—	December 30, 2000	Socorro	LINEAR	HYG	6.3 km	MPC · JPL
106945	2000 YN_{75}	—	December 30, 2000	Socorro	LINEAR	·	890 m	MPC · JPL
106946	2000 YD_{76}	—	December 30, 2000	Socorro	LINEAR	·	1.5 km	MPC · JPL
106947	2000 YL_{76}	—	December 30, 2000	Socorro	LINEAR	·	1.7 km	MPC · JPL
106948	2000 YM_{76}	—	December 30, 2000	Socorro	LINEAR	TIR ·	5.1 km	MPC · JPL
106949	2000 YO_{76}	—	December 30, 2000	Socorro	LINEAR	NYS	1.8 km	MPC · JPL
106950	2000 YW_{76}	—	December 30, 2000	Socorro	LINEAR	·	1.6 km	MPC · JPL
106951	2000 YQ_{77}	—	December 30, 2000	Socorro	LINEAR	·	1.5 km	MPC · JPL
106952	2000 YW_{77}	—	December 30, 2000	Socorro	LINEAR	·	4.8 km	MPC · JPL
106953	2000 YL_{78}	—	December 30, 2000	Socorro	LINEAR	·	2.8 km	MPC · JPL
106954	2000 YS_{78}	—	December 30, 2000	Socorro	LINEAR	·	6.3 km	MPC · JPL
106955	2000 YY_{78}	—	December 30, 2000	Socorro	LINEAR	·	2.1 km	MPC · JPL
106956	2000 YZ_{78}	—	December 30, 2000	Socorro	LINEAR	NYS	2.2 km	MPC · JPL
106957	2000 YJ_{79}	—	December 30, 2000	Socorro	LINEAR	·	2.6 km	MPC · JPL
106958	2000 YN_{79}	—	December 30, 2000	Socorro	LINEAR	·	2.6 km	MPC · JPL
106959	2000 YR_{79}	—	December 30, 2000	Socorro	LINEAR	·	2.2 km	MPC · JPL
106960	2000 YU_{79}	—	December 30, 2000	Socorro	LINEAR	·	2.4 km	MPC · JPL
106961	2000 YZ_{79}	—	December 30, 2000	Socorro	LINEAR	·	6.6 km	MPC · JPL
106962	2000 YO_{80}	—	December 30, 2000	Socorro	LINEAR	·	1.2 km	MPC · JPL
106963	2000 YC_{81}	—	December 30, 2000	Socorro	LINEAR	·	2.2 km	MPC · JPL
106964	2000 YJ_{82}	—	December 30, 2000	Socorro	LINEAR	·	1.2 km	MPC · JPL
106965	2000 YR_{84}	—	December 30, 2000	Socorro	LINEAR	NYS	2.1 km	MPC · JPL
106966	2000 YF_{85}	—	December 30, 2000	Socorro	LINEAR	NYS	2.4 km	MPC · JPL
106967	2000 YK_{85}	—	December 30, 2000	Socorro	LINEAR	·	2.7 km	MPC · JPL
106968	2000 YT_{86}	—	December 30, 2000	Socorro	LINEAR	·	2.1 km	MPC · JPL
106969	2000 YB_{87}	—	December 30, 2000	Socorro	LINEAR	HYG	7.1 km	MPC · JPL
106970	2000 YU_{89}	—	December 30, 2000	Socorro	LINEAR	MAS	1.5 km	MPC · JPL
106971	2000 YB_{90}	—	December 30, 2000	Socorro	LINEAR	(10654)	8.8 km	MPC · JPL
106972	2000 YN_{90}	—	December 30, 2000	Socorro	LINEAR	NYS	2.0 km	MPC · JPL
106973	2000 YR_{90}	—	December 30, 2000	Socorro	LINEAR	·	2.6 km	MPC · JPL
106974	2000 YW_{90}	—	December 30, 2000	Socorro	LINEAR	·	1.8 km	MPC · JPL
106975	2000 YW_{91}	—	December 30, 2000	Socorro	LINEAR	NYS	2.0 km	MPC · JPL
106976	2000 YP_{92}	—	December 30, 2000	Socorro	LINEAR	·	1.7 km	MPC · JPL
106977	2000 YG_{93}	—	December 30, 2000	Socorro	LINEAR	·	2.2 km	MPC · JPL
106978	2000 YO_{94}	—	December 30, 2000	Socorro	LINEAR	·	2.0 km	MPC · JPL
106979	2000 YV_{94}	—	December 30, 2000	Socorro	LINEAR	·	2.4 km	MPC · JPL
106980	2000 YM_{96}	—	December 30, 2000	Socorro	LINEAR	·	2.0 km	MPC · JPL
106981	2000 YU_{96}	—	December 30, 2000	Socorro	LINEAR	·	3.1 km	MPC · JPL
106982	2000 YJ_{97}	—	December 30, 2000	Socorro	LINEAR	NYS	2.0 km	MPC · JPL
106983	2000 YC_{98}	—	December 30, 2000	Socorro	LINEAR	NYS	2.6 km	MPC · JPL
106984	2000 YJ_{98}	—	December 30, 2000	Socorro	LINEAR	·	1.5 km	MPC · JPL
106985	2000 YD_{99}	—	December 30, 2000	Socorro	LINEAR	·	1.6 km	MPC · JPL
106986	2000 YC_{100}	—	December 30, 2000	Socorro	LINEAR	·	1.6 km	MPC · JPL
106987	2000 YG_{100}	—	December 26, 2000	Haleakala	NEAT	·	2.2 km	MPC · JPL
106988	2000 YE_{101}	—	December 29, 2000	Anderson Mesa	LONEOS	·	3.8 km	MPC · JPL
106989	2000 YN_{102}	—	December 28, 2000	Socorro	LINEAR	·	8.2 km	MPC · JPL
106990	2000 YX_{102}	—	December 28, 2000	Socorro	LINEAR	·	2.3 km	MPC · JPL
106991	2000 YL_{103}	—	December 28, 2000	Socorro	LINEAR	·	2.0 km	MPC · JPL
106992	2000 YT_{103}	—	December 28, 2000	Socorro	LINEAR	·	3.3 km	MPC · JPL
106993	2000 YC_{106}	—	December 28, 2000	Socorro	LINEAR	·	5.5 km	MPC · JPL
106994	2000 YJ_{106}	—	December 30, 2000	Socorro	LINEAR	·	1.8 km	MPC · JPL
106995	2000 YO_{107}	—	December 30, 2000	Socorro	LINEAR	NYS	3.0 km	MPC · JPL
106996	2000 YP_{107}	—	December 30, 2000	Socorro	LINEAR	MAS	1.3 km	MPC · JPL
106997	2000 YR_{108}	—	December 30, 2000	Socorro	LINEAR	·	1.8 km	MPC · JPL
106998	2000 YA_{109}	—	December 30, 2000	Socorro	LINEAR	V	1.5 km	MPC · JPL
106999	2000 YG_{109}	—	December 30, 2000	Socorro	LINEAR	·	1.7 km	MPC · JPL
107000	2000 YU_{109}	—	December 30, 2000	Socorro	LINEAR	·	2.4 km	MPC · JPL

back to top

== See also ==
- Meanings of minor-planet names: 106001–107000
