= Junk Bond Observatory =

Astronomical observatory in Cochise County, Arizona

- Alternative names: JBO
- Observatory code: 701
- Location: Sonoran Desert, Sierra Vista, Arizona, United States
- Coordinates: 31°28′31″N 110°12′14″W
- Altitude: 4,425 ft (1,349 m)
- Established: 1996
- Website: www.hacastronomy.com/jbofeed.php

Minor planets discovered: 53
see § List of discovered minor planets

The Junk Bond Observatory (JBO; code: 701) is located in the Sonoran Desert at Sierra Vista, Arizona, United States.

It was established by amateur astronomer David Healy in his backyard in 1996, using a Celestron 14 SCT and a 16-inch Meade LX200 telescope in a roll-off shelter. In 2000, a 20" Ritchey-Chretien was installed, to be replaced by a 32" Ritchey in 2004.

Asteroid searches began in 1998 using a local computer network and search software. The first discovery at the observatory was made by Jeff Medkeff in June 1999. It was named 38203 Sanner after Glen Sanner also a member of the Huachuca Astronomy Club.

As of November 2016, a total of 272 numbered minor planets have been discovered at the observatory, using a 32-inch telescope. The Minor Planet Center credits 219 of these discoveries to David Healy and/or Jeff Medkeff. The discovery of the remaining 53 numbered minor planets is credited directly to the observatory (see list below).

Until his death in 2011, David Healy was a frequent contributor of follow-up observations to objects on the Minor Planet Center's Near-Earth Object Confirmation Page, surveyed for asteroids netting approximately four new discoveries per month as of January 2007, performed discovery and confirmation photometry of extrasolar planet transits, and performed photometry of cataclysmic variable stars and active galactic nuclei. The telescope operated robotically, unattended for most of the night, controlled by software by Bob Denny and Jeff Medkeff.

JBO was dismantled in August 2021. The telescope, dome, and other equipment were purchased by a private buyer.

== List of discovered minor planets ==
The Minor Planet Center directly credits the Junk Bond Observatory with the discovery of 53 numbered minor planets during 2000–2005.

(145041) 2005 FJ_{6}	31 March 2005	list
(161574) 2005 DS	28 February 2005	list
(171241) 2005 KY_{11}	30 May 2005	list
(180926) 2005 LD_{24}	11 June 2005	list
(198492) 2004 XU_{62}	10 December 2004	list
(202307) 2005 DQ	28 February 2005	list
(207111) 2005 AS_{30}	9 January 2005	list
(214257) 2005 GP	1 April 2005	list
(215936) 2005 KQ_{10}	30 May 2005	list
(223988) 2005 BX_{1}	16 January 2005	list
(226515) 2003 UO_{45}	18 October 2003	list
(232900) 2004 XG_{51}	14 December 2004	list
(232967) 2005 EY_{70}	4 March 2005	list
(235910) 2005 EO_{25}	3 March 2005	list
(236032) 2005 GY_{166}	11 April 2005	list
(240615) 2004 XU_{49}	13 December 2004	list
(242515) 2004 YS_{32}	31 December 2004	list
(245312) 2005 EQ_{37}	7 March 2005	list
(245358) 2005 EF_{272}	11 March 2005	list
(250352) 2003 SA_{217}	27 September 2003	list

(253592) 2003 TV_{12}	15 October 2003	list
(253604) 2003 UE_{24}	23 October 2003	list
(257964) 2001 BD_{61}	30 January 2001	list
(259523) 2003 UA_{24}	23 October 2003	list
(259683) 2003 XE_{15}	15 December 2003	list
(267977) 2004 FY_{145}	30 March 2004	list
(272010) 2005 DP	28 February 2005	list
(275727) 2001 BG_{61}	30 January 2001	list
(277053) 2005 EO_{37}	4 March 2005	list
(280617) 2004 XC_{63}	15 December 2004	list
(280635) 2004 YO_{1}	19 December 2004	list
(280707) 2005 GV_{59}	6 April 2005	list
(287839) 2003 SY_{218}	28 September 2003	list
(298439) 2003 UB_{24}	23 October 2003	list
(299081) 2005 EK_{39}	8 March 2005	list
(308199) 2005 EY_{32}	4 March 2005	list
(311195) 2004 XZ_{62}	14 December 2004	list
(314162) 2005 FL_{8}	21 March 2005	list
(331965) 2004 XK_{41}	11 December 2004	list
(334977) 2004 ED_{52}	15 March 2004	list

(335192) 2005 EC_{24}	3 March 2005	list
(337309) 2000 YD_{125}	29 December 2000	list
(337320) 2001 BF_{61}	30 January 2001	list
(344969) 2004 XQ_{49}	10 December 2004	list
(345016) 2005 EP_{4}	1 March 2005	list
(345066) 2005 JR_{1}	3 May 2005	list
(348396) 2005 HA_{3}	17 April 2005	list
(351332) 2004 XH_{41}	10 December 2004	list
(363457) 2003 SB_{208}	26 September 2003	list
(370553) 2003 UD_{24}	23 October 2003	list
(387919) 2004 YT_{32}	31 December 2004	list
(427601) 2003 SC_{208}	26 September 2003	list
(446968) 2003 UP_{190}	23 October 2003	list

== See also ==
- List of asteroid-discovering observatories
- List of astronomical observatories
- List of minor planet discoverers § Discovering dedicated institutions
- List of observatory codes
