= Wendy Freedman =

Canadian-American astronomer

Wendy Freedman FRS
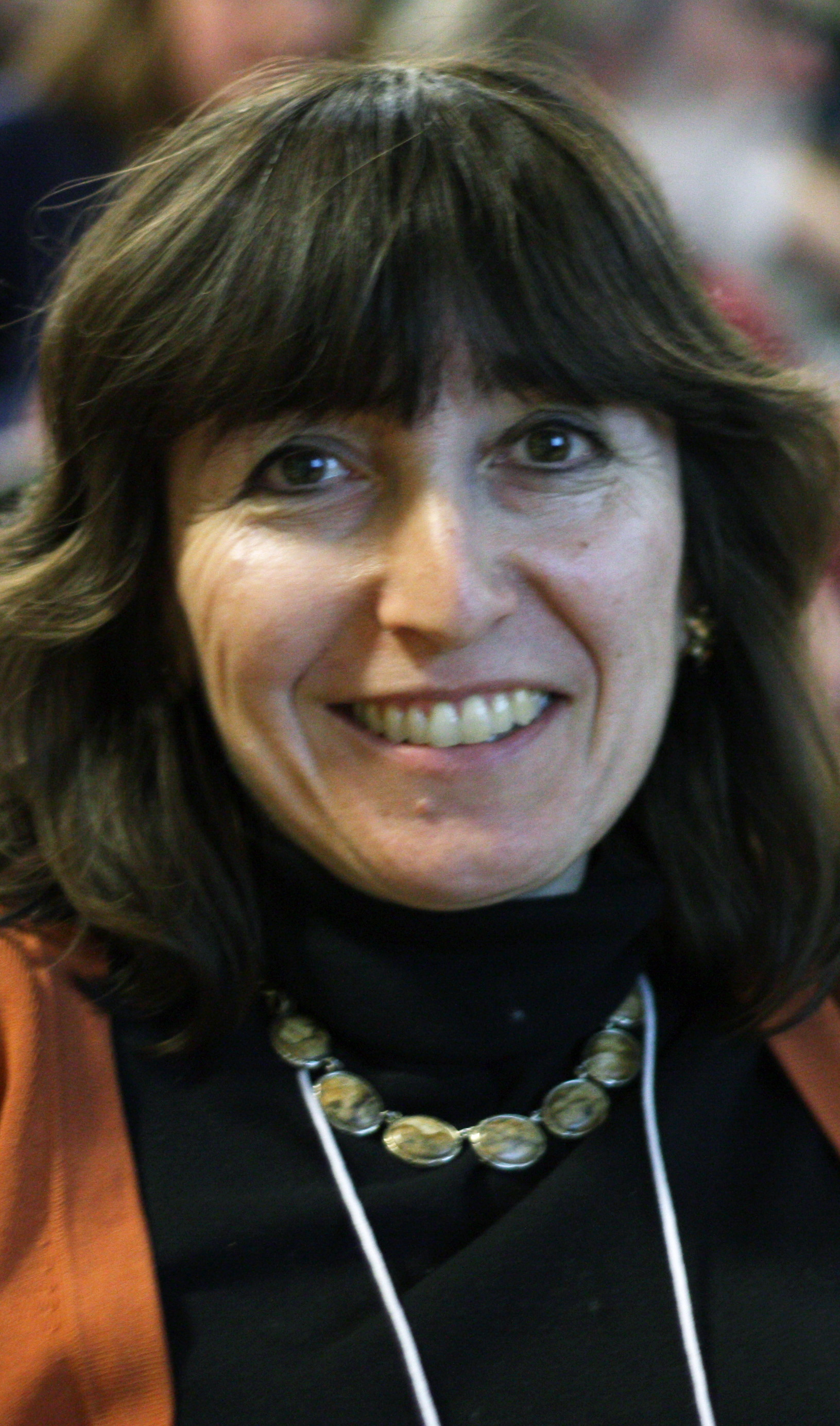
- Freedman in 2010
- Born: July 17, 1957 (age 69); Toronto, Canada
- Education: University of Toronto (B.Sc. & Ph.D.)
- Awards: Magellanic Premium (2002); Gruber Cosmology Prize (2009); Dannie Heineman Prize for Astrophysics (2016); Nature's 10 (2024)
- Scientific career
- Workplaces: Carnegie Observatories; University of Chicago
- Thesis: The Young Stellar Content of Nearby Resolved Galaxies (1984)

Wendy Laurel Freedman FRS (born July 17, 1957) is a Canadian-American astronomer, best known for her measurement of the Hubble constant, and as director of the Carnegie Observatories in Pasadena, California, and Las Campanas, Chile. She is now the John & Marion Sullivan University Professor of Astronomy and Astrophysics at the University of Chicago. Her principal research interests are in observational cosmology, focusing on measuring both the current and past expansion rates of the universe, and on understanding if there is missing physics in the standard (Lambda Cold Dark Matter) cosmological model.

In 2025, Time magazine listed her as one of the world's 100 most influential people.

== Early life and career ==
Freedman grew up in Toronto in a Jewish family, the daughter of a medical doctor and a concert pianist. Her early interest in science was kindled by a formative high-school physics class. This led her to the University of Toronto, where she was first a biophysics student, then an astronomy major, receiving her B.Sc. in 1979. She remained at Toronto for her graduate work, receiving a Ph.D. in astronomy and astrophysics in 1984. Joining the Carnegie Observatories in Pasadena, California, as a post-doctoral fellow in 1984, she became a faculty member of the scientific staff three years later as the first woman to join Carnegie's permanent staff. In 2003 she was named to the Crawford H. Greenewalt Chair and Director of Carnegie Observatories. Freedman's early work was principally on the Cepheid distance scale and the stellar populations of nearby galaxies.

== Hubble constant ==
Freedman was co-leader of an international team of 30 astronomers to carry out the Hubble Space Telescope Key Project, a program aiming to establish the distance scale of the Universe and measure the current expansion rate, a quantity known as the Hubble constant. This quantity determines the size of the visible universe and is key to determining its age. Over the course of the Key Project, the team measured the distances to 24 galaxies using Cepheid variable stars, and measured the Hubble constant using five independent methods. The project's researchers, led by Freedman, published their final result in 2001. The work provided a value of the Hubble constant accurate to 10%, resolving a long-standing, factor-of-two debate.

She continues to refine her measurements of the Hubble constant using not just Cepheid variables but also the method of the tip of the red-giant branch.

== Giant Magellan Telescope ==
Freedman initiated the Giant Magellan Telescope (GMT) Project and served as chair of the board of directors from its inception in 2003 until 2015. GMT is an international consortium of leading universities and science institutions to build a 25-meter optical telescope at the Carnegie Institution for Science's Las Campanas Observatory in the Chilean Andes. With a primary mirror 80 feet (24 meters) in diameter, the GMT is poised to be the world's second largest ground-based telescope when it is completed. The telescope, which has entered its construction phase and is expected to become fully operational by 2034, will be able to produce images 10 times sharper than those of the Hubble Space Telescope.

== Recognition ==
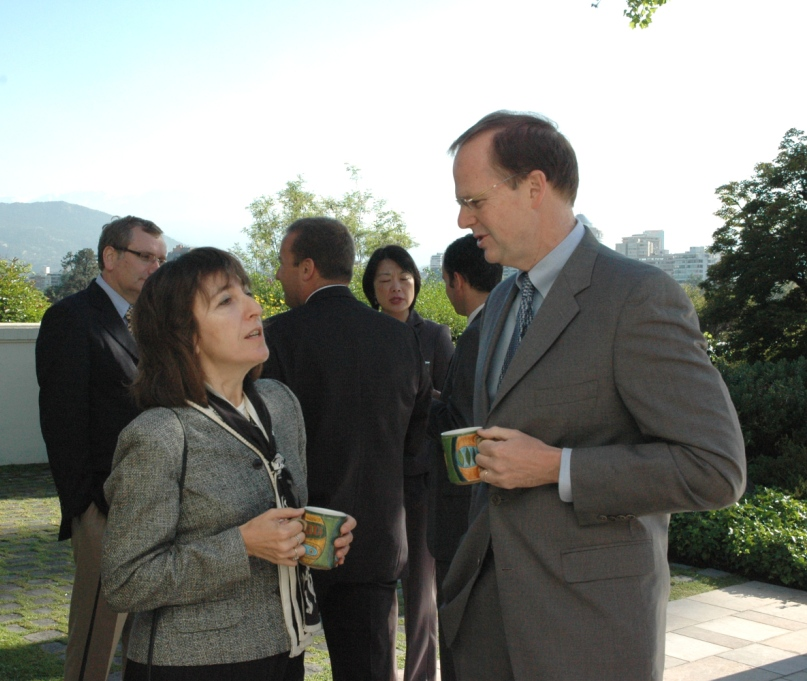
Freedman with the American ambassador to Chile in 2009

Freedman has been elected a member of the US National Academy of Sciences, the American Philosophical Society, the American Academy of Arts and Sciences, and a Fellow of the American Physical Society and a Legacy Fellow of the American Astronomical Society. She was elected Fellow of the Royal Society in 2023.

She has received several awards for her contributions to observational cosmology, including a Centennial Lectureship of the American Physical Society (1999), the John P. McGovern Award in Science (2000), the Magellanic Premium Award of the American Philosophical Society (2002) and the Marc Aaronson Lectureship and prize (1994) "in recognition of a decade of fundamental contributions to the areas of the extra galactic distance scale and the stellar populations of galaxies". In 2009 Freedman was one of three co-recipients of the Gruber Cosmology Prize. She received the 2016 Dannie Heineman Prize for Astrophysics, awarded jointly by the American Institute of Physics and the American Astronomical Society, "for her outstanding contributions and leadership role in using optical and infrared space- and ground-based observations of Cepheid stars, together with innovative analysis techniques, to greatly improve the accuracy of the cosmic distance scale and thereby constrain fundamental cosmological parameters."

She was elected a Legacy Fellow of the American Astronomical Society in 2020

In 2024, she was included in Nature's 10.

In 2025, Freedman was a recipient of the National Medal of Science.

In 2026, Freedman received a Doctor of Science degree from Clark University.

Asteroid 107638 Wendyfreedman, discovered by David Healy at the Junk Bond Observatory in 2001, was named in her honor. The official naming citation was published by the Minor Planet Center on 6 January 2007 (M.P.C. 58597).

== Personal life ==
Freedman is married to longtime collaborator Barry F. Madore. They have two children.

== See also ==
- List of women in leadership positions on astronomical instrumentation projects
