= Meanings of minor-planet names: 107001–108000 =

As minor planet discoveries are confirmed, they are given a permanent number by the IAU's Minor Planet Center (MPC), and the discoverers can then submit names for them, following the IAU's naming conventions. The list below concerns those minor planets in the specified number-range that have received names, and explains the meanings of those names.

Official naming citations of newly named small Solar System bodies are approved and published in a bulletin by IAU's Working Group for Small Bodies Nomenclature (WGSBN). Before May 2021, citations were published in MPC's Minor Planet Circulars for many decades. Recent citations can also be found on the JPL Small-Body Database (SBDB). Until his death in 2016, German astronomer Lutz D. Schmadel compiled these citations into the Dictionary of Minor Planet Names (DMP) and regularly updated the collection.

Based on Paul Herget's The Names of the Minor Planets, Schmadel also researched the unclear origin of numerous asteroids, most of which had been named prior to World War II. This article incorporates text from this source, which is in the public domain: SBDB New namings may only be added to this list below after official publication as the preannouncement of names is condemned. The WGSBN publishes a comprehensive guideline for the naming rules of non-cometary small Solar System bodies.

== 107001–107100 ==
Named minor planet	Provisional	This minor planet was named for...	Ref · Catalog
107052 Aquincum	2001 AQ	Aquincum, one of the northernmost Roman garrisons of the first through fourth centuries in central Europe, where now stands Óbuda, part of modern Budapest (this minor planet honours the Council of Óbuda for endorsing Hungarian amateur astronomy)	JPL · 107052
107054 Daniela	2001 AB_{2}	Daniela Rapavá (born 1956) is a Slovak astronomer who is a popularizer of the natural sciences, including ecological science. She creates beautiful and unusual photography of physical phenomena, and is the founder of The Inventive Astropark at Rimavská Sobota Observatory.	JPL · 107054
107074 Ansonsylva	2001 AJ_{19}	Anson J. Sylva (born 1956), American member of the Air Force Maui Optical and Supercomputing (AMOS) team	JPL · 107074

== 107101–107200 ==
back to top

Named minor planet	Provisional	This minor planet was named for...	Ref · Catalog
There are no named minor planets in this number range

== 107201–107300 ==
back to top

Named minor planet	Provisional	This minor planet was named for...	Ref · Catalog
107223 Ripero	2001 BU_{50}	José Ripero (born 1955), Spanish amateur astronomer, co-founder of the M 1 observers group and president of the Centro Astronomico de Ávila, author of El Vigía del Cosmos	JPL · 107223

== 107301–107400 ==
back to top

Named minor planet	Provisional	This minor planet was named for...	Ref · Catalog
107379 Johnlogan	2001 CG_{37}	John Logan (born 1961) is a highly acclaimed and award-winning writer of fiction and screenplays. Among his many successes are Gladiator, The Last Samurai and Penny Dreadful, each expertly probing the essence of the nature of humans.	JPL · 107379
107393 Bernacca	2001 CJ_{48}	Pier Luigi Bernacca (1940–2013), associate professor of astronomy, was director for several years of the PhD School of Space Sciences and Technologies at the University of Padova.	JPL · 107393
107396 Swangin	2001 DU	Gary Swangin (born 1942) is the Planetarium Astronomer and Manager of the Panther Planetarium in Paterson NJ, and was formerly the director of the Newark Museum Planetarium in Newark, NJ. He has produced radio and video materials for public education about astronomy, recombinant DNA and other topics, and been nominated for a Peabody Award.	IAU · 107396

== 107401–107500 ==
back to top

Named minor planet	Provisional	This minor planet was named for...	Ref · Catalog
There are no named minor planets in this number range

== 107501–107600 ==
back to top

Named minor planet	Provisional	This minor planet was named for...	Ref · Catalog
107561 Quinn	2001 DW_{86}	Quinn, South Dakota, USA, was established in 1907 and named after Michael Quinn, a pioneering rancher and bullwacker. Badlands Observatory, where this asteroid was discovered, is located within the former Quinn Community Hospital. The city, and the West River Electric Association, installed full-cutoff light fixtures in support of the observatory.	IAU · 107561

== 107601–107700 ==
back to top

Named minor planet	Provisional	This minor planet was named for...	Ref · Catalog
107638 Wendyfreedman	2001 EU_{13}	Wendy Freedman (born 1957), Canadian-American astronomer, director of the Carnegie Institution's observatories, and project leader for Giant Magellan Telescope	JPL · 107638

== 107701–107800 ==
back to top

Named minor planet	Provisional	This minor planet was named for...	Ref · Catalog
There are no named minor planets in this number range

== 107801–107900 ==
back to top

Named minor planet	Provisional	This minor planet was named for...	Ref · Catalog
107805 Saibi	2001 FY_{58}	Saibi Koto-gakko, private high school in Ehime prefecture, Japan	JPL · 107805

== 107901–108000 ==
back to top

Named minor planet	Provisional	This minor planet was named for...	Ref · Catalog
There are no named minor planets in this number range

back to top

Preceded by 106,001–107,000	Meanings of minor-planet names List of minor planets: 107,001–108,000	Succeeded by 108,001–109,000
