= List of minor planets: 107001–108000 =

The following is a partial list of minor planets, running from minor-planet number 107001 through 108000, inclusive. The primary data for this and other partial lists is based on JPL's "Small-Body Orbital Elements" and data available from the Minor Planet Center. Critical list information is also provided by the MPC, unless otherwise specified from Lowell Observatory. A detailed description of the table's columns and additional sources are given on the main page including a complete list of every page in this series, and a statistical break-up on the dynamical classification of minor planets.

Also see the summary list of all named bodies in numerical and alphabetical order, and the corresponding naming citations for the number range of this particular list. New namings may only be added to this list after official publication, as the preannouncement of names is condemned by the Working Group for Small Bodies Nomenclature of the International Astronomical Union.

Near-Earth obj.	MBA (inner)	MBA (outer)	Centaur
Mars-crosser	MBA (middle)	Jupiter trojan	Trans-Neptunian obj.
Unclassified

== 107001–107100 ==
Designation			Discovery			Properties		Ref
Permanent	Provisional	Named after	Date	Site	Discoverer(s)	Category	Diam.	Ref
107001	2000 YW_{109}	—	December 30, 2000	Socorro	LINEAR	NYS	1.8 km	MPC · JPL
107002	2000 YY_{109}	—	December 30, 2000	Socorro	LINEAR	·	2.7 km	MPC · JPL
107003	2000 YS_{110}	—	December 30, 2000	Socorro	LINEAR	·	1.1 km	MPC · JPL
107004	2000 YC_{112}	—	December 30, 2000	Socorro	LINEAR	L4	20 km	MPC · JPL
107005	2000 YE_{112}	—	December 30, 2000	Socorro	LINEAR	·	1.6 km	MPC · JPL
107006	2000 YH_{112}	—	December 30, 2000	Socorro	LINEAR	·	1.6 km	MPC · JPL
107007	2000 YL_{112}	—	December 30, 2000	Socorro	LINEAR	ADE	7.0 km	MPC · JPL
107008	2000 YM_{112}	—	December 30, 2000	Socorro	LINEAR	·	1.7 km	MPC · JPL
107009	2000 YA_{113}	—	December 30, 2000	Socorro	LINEAR	NYS	3.1 km	MPC · JPL
107010	2000 YD_{113}	—	December 30, 2000	Socorro	LINEAR	·	3.5 km	MPC · JPL
107011	2000 YQ_{113}	—	December 30, 2000	Socorro	LINEAR	HYG	4.6 km	MPC · JPL
107012	2000 YS_{113}	—	December 30, 2000	Socorro	LINEAR	NYS	2.1 km	MPC · JPL
107013	2000 YG_{114}	—	December 30, 2000	Socorro	LINEAR	·	4.0 km	MPC · JPL
107014	2000 YJ_{114}	—	December 30, 2000	Socorro	LINEAR	·	1.2 km	MPC · JPL
107015	2000 YQ_{114}	—	December 30, 2000	Socorro	LINEAR	·	1.2 km	MPC · JPL
107016	2000 YK_{115}	—	December 30, 2000	Socorro	LINEAR	MAS	1.5 km	MPC · JPL
107017	2000 YQ_{115}	—	December 30, 2000	Socorro	LINEAR	NYS	2.5 km	MPC · JPL
107018	2000 YW_{115}	—	December 30, 2000	Socorro	LINEAR	NYS	2.0 km	MPC · JPL
107019	2000 YF_{116}	—	December 30, 2000	Socorro	LINEAR	·	1.7 km	MPC · JPL
107020	2000 YJ_{116}	—	December 30, 2000	Socorro	LINEAR	·	3.1 km	MPC · JPL
107021	2000 YK_{116}	—	December 30, 2000	Socorro	LINEAR	NYS	2.5 km	MPC · JPL
107022	2000 YL_{116}	—	December 30, 2000	Socorro	LINEAR	·	3.8 km	MPC · JPL
107023	2000 YV_{116}	—	December 30, 2000	Socorro	LINEAR	·	2.7 km	MPC · JPL
107024	2000 YR_{117}	—	December 30, 2000	Socorro	LINEAR	RAF	2.8 km	MPC · JPL
107025	2000 YB_{118}	—	December 30, 2000	Socorro	LINEAR	V	1.5 km	MPC · JPL
107026	2000 YQ_{118}	—	December 28, 2000	Socorro	LINEAR	V	1.3 km	MPC · JPL
107027	2000 YK_{119}	—	December 29, 2000	Anderson Mesa	LONEOS	·	2.6 km	MPC · JPL
107028	2000 YH_{121}	—	December 21, 2000	Socorro	LINEAR	·	3.2 km	MPC · JPL
107029	2000 YL_{121}	—	December 22, 2000	Socorro	LINEAR	T_{j} (2.98) · EUP	9.3 km	MPC · JPL
107030	2000 YR_{121}	—	December 22, 2000	Anderson Mesa	LONEOS	·	5.3 km	MPC · JPL
107031	2000 YL_{123}	—	December 28, 2000	Kitt Peak	Spacewatch	NYS	2.5 km	MPC · JPL
107032	2000 YB_{124}	—	December 29, 2000	Anderson Mesa	LONEOS	PHO	4.6 km	MPC · JPL
107033	2000 YD_{124}	—	December 29, 2000	Anderson Mesa	LONEOS	·	3.1 km	MPC · JPL
107034	2000 YH_{126}	—	December 29, 2000	Anderson Mesa	LONEOS	KON	3.6 km	MPC · JPL
107035	2000 YS_{126}	—	December 29, 2000	Anderson Mesa	LONEOS	·	2.2 km	MPC · JPL
107036	2000 YW_{126}	—	December 29, 2000	Anderson Mesa	LONEOS	·	2.8 km	MPC · JPL
107037	2000 YY_{126}	—	December 29, 2000	Anderson Mesa	LONEOS	·	3.1 km	MPC · JPL
107038	2000 YO_{127}	—	December 29, 2000	Haleakala	NEAT	·	2.1 km	MPC · JPL
107039	2000 YR_{127}	—	December 29, 2000	Haleakala	NEAT	·	1.9 km	MPC · JPL
107040	2000 YN_{128}	—	December 29, 2000	Haleakala	NEAT	·	2.3 km	MPC · JPL
107041	2000 YR_{128}	—	December 29, 2000	Haleakala	NEAT	·	2.1 km	MPC · JPL
107042	2000 YD_{129}	—	December 29, 2000	Haleakala	NEAT	EUN	1.7 km	MPC · JPL
107043	2000 YE_{129}	—	December 29, 2000	Haleakala	NEAT	·	1.7 km	MPC · JPL
107044	2000 YP_{131}	—	December 30, 2000	Socorro	LINEAR	NYS	1.7 km	MPC · JPL
107045	2000 YS_{133}	—	December 31, 2000	Kitt Peak	Spacewatch	·	2.0 km	MPC · JPL
107046	2000 YF_{136}	—	December 22, 2000	Kitt Peak	Spacewatch	·	1.3 km	MPC · JPL
107047	2000 YL_{138}	—	December 26, 2000	Kitt Peak	Spacewatch	NYS	2.3 km	MPC · JPL
107048	2000 YR_{138}	—	December 26, 2000	Kitt Peak	Spacewatch	·	1.5 km	MPC · JPL
107049	2000 YZ_{139}	—	December 31, 2000	Anderson Mesa	LONEOS	·	2.6 km	MPC · JPL
107050	2000 YM_{142}	—	December 28, 2000	Socorro	LINEAR	·	3.8 km	MPC · JPL
107051	2001 AD	—	January 1, 2001	Kitt Peak	Spacewatch	·	1.2 km	MPC · JPL
107052 Aquincum	2001 AQ	Aquincum	January 1, 2001	Piszkéstető	K. Sárneczky, L. Kiss	·	1.4 km	MPC · JPL
107053	2001 AZ_{1}	—	January 3, 2001	Desert Beaver	W. K. Y. Yeung	·	2.9 km	MPC · JPL
107054 Daniela	2001 AB_{2}	Daniela	January 1, 2001	Ondřejov	P. Kušnirák	·	1.8 km	MPC · JPL
107055	2001 AC_{3}	—	January 3, 2001	Kitt Peak	Spacewatch	V	1.2 km	MPC · JPL
107056	2001 AC_{4}	—	January 2, 2001	Socorro	LINEAR	·	3.0 km	MPC · JPL
107057	2001 AW_{4}	—	January 2, 2001	Socorro	LINEAR	·	2.4 km	MPC · JPL
107058	2001 AW_{6}	—	January 2, 2001	Socorro	LINEAR	·	1.4 km	MPC · JPL
107059	2001 AK_{8}	—	January 2, 2001	Socorro	LINEAR	·	2.2 km	MPC · JPL
107060	2001 AB_{9}	—	January 2, 2001	Socorro	LINEAR	·	2.1 km	MPC · JPL
107061	2001 AR_{9}	—	January 2, 2001	Socorro	LINEAR	·	2.3 km	MPC · JPL
107062	2001 AP_{10}	—	January 2, 2001	Socorro	LINEAR	·	2.1 km	MPC · JPL
107063	2001 AD_{11}	—	January 2, 2001	Socorro	LINEAR	·	1.8 km	MPC · JPL
107064	2001 AH_{12}	—	January 2, 2001	Socorro	LINEAR	·	2.0 km	MPC · JPL
107065	2001 AB_{13}	—	January 2, 2001	Socorro	LINEAR	·	2.7 km	MPC · JPL
107066	2001 AC_{13}	—	January 2, 2001	Socorro	LINEAR	·	2.1 km	MPC · JPL
107067	2001 AE_{15}	—	January 2, 2001	Socorro	LINEAR	(5)	2.5 km	MPC · JPL
107068	2001 AP_{15}	—	January 2, 2001	Socorro	LINEAR	(5)	2.1 km	MPC · JPL
107069	2001 AU_{15}	—	January 2, 2001	Socorro	LINEAR	·	4.0 km	MPC · JPL
107070	2001 AH_{16}	—	January 2, 2001	Socorro	LINEAR	·	2.6 km	MPC · JPL
107071	2001 AJ_{17}	—	January 2, 2001	Socorro	LINEAR	·	2.5 km	MPC · JPL
107072	2001 AL_{18}	—	January 2, 2001	Socorro	LINEAR	PHO	3.0 km	MPC · JPL
107073	2001 AZ_{18}	—	January 4, 2001	Haleakala	NEAT	NYS	1.6 km	MPC · JPL
107074 Ansonsylva	2001 AJ_{19}	Ansonsylva	January 14, 2001	Haleakala	NEAT	·	1.3 km	MPC · JPL
107075	2001 AW_{20}	—	January 3, 2001	Socorro	LINEAR	·	1.3 km	MPC · JPL
107076	2001 AM_{21}	—	January 3, 2001	Socorro	LINEAR	·	4.1 km	MPC · JPL
107077	2001 AO_{21}	—	January 3, 2001	Socorro	LINEAR	·	2.3 km	MPC · JPL
107078	2001 AF_{23}	—	January 3, 2001	Socorro	LINEAR	·	1.4 km	MPC · JPL
107079	2001 AR_{23}	—	January 3, 2001	Socorro	LINEAR	ADE	5.4 km	MPC · JPL
107080	2001 AY_{23}	—	January 2, 2001	Socorro	LINEAR	·	2.4 km	MPC · JPL
107081	2001 AC_{24}	—	January 3, 2001	Socorro	LINEAR	·	3.5 km	MPC · JPL
107082	2001 AK_{24}	—	January 4, 2001	Socorro	LINEAR	·	1.4 km	MPC · JPL
107083	2001 AP_{24}	—	January 4, 2001	Socorro	LINEAR	·	2.6 km	MPC · JPL
107084	2001 AQ_{24}	—	January 4, 2001	Socorro	LINEAR	·	1.7 km	MPC · JPL
107085	2001 AT_{24}	—	January 4, 2001	Socorro	LINEAR	V	1.8 km	MPC · JPL
107086	2001 AE_{25}	—	January 4, 2001	Socorro	LINEAR	·	1.9 km	MPC · JPL
107087	2001 AK_{25}	—	January 4, 2001	Socorro	LINEAR	·	2.1 km	MPC · JPL
107088	2001 AQ_{25}	—	January 5, 2001	Socorro	LINEAR	·	1.7 km	MPC · JPL
107089	2001 AA_{28}	—	January 5, 2001	Socorro	LINEAR	·	1.2 km	MPC · JPL
107090	2001 AG_{28}	—	January 5, 2001	Socorro	LINEAR	·	2.4 km	MPC · JPL
107091	2001 AW_{28}	—	January 4, 2001	Socorro	LINEAR	·	2.2 km	MPC · JPL
107092	2001 AD_{29}	—	January 4, 2001	Socorro	LINEAR	·	1.9 km	MPC · JPL
107093	2001 AG_{29}	—	January 4, 2001	Socorro	LINEAR	NYS	2.5 km	MPC · JPL
107094	2001 AL_{29}	—	January 4, 2001	Socorro	LINEAR	·	1.3 km	MPC · JPL
107095	2001 AA_{30}	—	January 4, 2001	Socorro	LINEAR	·	3.8 km	MPC · JPL
107096	2001 AC_{30}	—	January 4, 2001	Socorro	LINEAR	·	2.4 km	MPC · JPL
107097	2001 AJ_{30}	—	January 4, 2001	Socorro	LINEAR	NYS	2.3 km	MPC · JPL
107098	2001 AE_{31}	—	January 4, 2001	Socorro	LINEAR	·	3.1 km	MPC · JPL
107099	2001 AU_{31}	—	January 4, 2001	Socorro	LINEAR	·	1.5 km	MPC · JPL
107100	2001 AY_{31}	—	January 4, 2001	Socorro	LINEAR	·	2.1 km	MPC · JPL

== 107101–107200 ==
back to top

Designation			Discovery			Properties		Ref
Permanent	Provisional	Named after	Date	Site	Discoverer(s)	Category	Diam.	Ref
107101	2001 AM_{32}	—	January 4, 2001	Socorro	LINEAR	·	2.6 km	MPC · JPL
107102	2001 AV_{33}	—	January 4, 2001	Socorro	LINEAR	(2076)	2.8 km	MPC · JPL
107103	2001 AL_{34}	—	January 4, 2001	Socorro	LINEAR	·	1.7 km	MPC · JPL
107104	2001 AT_{34}	—	January 4, 2001	Socorro	LINEAR	·	2.1 km	MPC · JPL
107105	2001 AB_{35}	—	January 5, 2001	Socorro	LINEAR	·	2.8 km	MPC · JPL
107106	2001 AW_{35}	—	January 5, 2001	Socorro	LINEAR	V	1.3 km	MPC · JPL
107107	2001 AG_{36}	—	January 5, 2001	Socorro	LINEAR	·	3.1 km	MPC · JPL
107108	2001 AJ_{36}	—	January 5, 2001	Socorro	LINEAR	·	2.0 km	MPC · JPL
107109	2001 AN_{36}	—	January 5, 2001	Socorro	LINEAR	·	1.8 km	MPC · JPL
107110	2001 AG_{37}	—	January 5, 2001	Socorro	LINEAR	PHO	5.4 km	MPC · JPL
107111	2001 AJ_{37}	—	January 5, 2001	Socorro	LINEAR	·	4.1 km	MPC · JPL
107112	2001 AR_{37}	—	January 5, 2001	Socorro	LINEAR	·	5.2 km	MPC · JPL
107113	2001 AS_{37}	—	January 5, 2001	Socorro	LINEAR	·	2.8 km	MPC · JPL
107114	2001 AD_{38}	—	January 5, 2001	Socorro	LINEAR	EUN	3.3 km	MPC · JPL
107115	2001 AG_{38}	—	January 5, 2001	Socorro	LINEAR	PHO	2.8 km	MPC · JPL
107116	2001 AB_{39}	—	January 2, 2001	Haleakala	NEAT	·	3.3 km	MPC · JPL
107117	2001 AC_{39}	—	January 2, 2001	Socorro	LINEAR	MAS	1.8 km	MPC · JPL
107118	2001 AL_{39}	—	January 2, 2001	Kitt Peak	Spacewatch	NYS	2.1 km	MPC · JPL
107119	2001 AM_{39}	—	January 2, 2001	Kitt Peak	Spacewatch	·	1.2 km	MPC · JPL
107120	2001 AP_{39}	—	January 3, 2001	Socorro	LINEAR	·	1.7 km	MPC · JPL
107121	2001 AO_{40}	—	January 3, 2001	Anderson Mesa	LONEOS	BRA	4.1 km	MPC · JPL
107122	2001 AE_{41}	—	January 3, 2001	Socorro	LINEAR	NYS	2.4 km	MPC · JPL
107123	2001 AX_{42}	—	January 4, 2001	Anderson Mesa	LONEOS	·	2.4 km	MPC · JPL
107124	2001 AR_{45}	—	January 15, 2001	Socorro	LINEAR	·	1.5 km	MPC · JPL
107125	2001 AU_{45}	—	January 15, 2001	Socorro	LINEAR	·	2.2 km	MPC · JPL
107126	2001 AN_{46}	—	January 15, 2001	Socorro	LINEAR	H ·	1.1 km	MPC · JPL
107127	2001 AX_{46}	—	January 15, 2001	Socorro	LINEAR	PHO	2.0 km	MPC · JPL
107128	2001 AG_{47}	—	January 15, 2001	Socorro	LINEAR	PHO	3.6 km	MPC · JPL
107129	2001 AS_{47}	—	January 15, 2001	Socorro	LINEAR	PHO	2.2 km	MPC · JPL
107130	2001 AV_{47}	—	January 15, 2001	Socorro	LINEAR	PHO	1.7 km	MPC · JPL
107131	2001 AP_{48}	—	January 4, 2001	Socorro	LINEAR	·	1.7 km	MPC · JPL
107132	2001 AA_{49}	—	January 15, 2001	Socorro	LINEAR	H	1.1 km	MPC · JPL
107133	2001 AW_{50}	—	January 15, 2001	Kitt Peak	Spacewatch	MAS	1.4 km	MPC · JPL
107134	2001 AE_{51}	—	January 15, 2001	Kitt Peak	Spacewatch	L4	10 km	MPC · JPL
107135	2001 BH	—	January 17, 2001	Oizumi	T. Kobayashi	·	2.5 km	MPC · JPL
107136	2001 BQ	—	January 17, 2001	Oizumi	T. Kobayashi	·	4.2 km	MPC · JPL
107137	2001 BW	—	January 17, 2001	Oizumi	T. Kobayashi	EUN	2.4 km	MPC · JPL
107138	2001 BP_{3}	—	January 18, 2001	Socorro	LINEAR	·	2.2 km	MPC · JPL
107139	2001 BB_{4}	—	January 18, 2001	Socorro	LINEAR	·	1.3 km	MPC · JPL
107140	2001 BC_{5}	—	January 18, 2001	Socorro	LINEAR	·	2.4 km	MPC · JPL
107141	2001 BP_{5}	—	January 19, 2001	Socorro	LINEAR	H	950 m	MPC · JPL
107142	2001 BN_{6}	—	January 19, 2001	Socorro	LINEAR	·	1.6 km	MPC · JPL
107143	2001 BW_{6}	—	January 19, 2001	Socorro	LINEAR	ERI	2.3 km	MPC · JPL
107144	2001 BZ_{7}	—	January 19, 2001	Socorro	LINEAR	·	1.9 km	MPC · JPL
107145	2001 BA_{8}	—	January 19, 2001	Socorro	LINEAR	·	4.4 km	MPC · JPL
107146	2001 BK_{8}	—	January 19, 2001	Socorro	LINEAR	NYS ·	2.8 km	MPC · JPL
107147	2001 BG_{9}	—	January 19, 2001	Socorro	LINEAR	·	2.0 km	MPC · JPL
107148	2001 BR_{10}	—	January 20, 2001	Socorro	LINEAR	H	1.5 km	MPC · JPL
107149	2001 BS_{10}	—	January 20, 2001	Socorro	LINEAR	·	1.4 km	MPC · JPL
107150	2001 BW_{10}	—	January 20, 2001	Socorro	LINEAR	·	1.8 km	MPC · JPL
107151	2001 BU_{12}	—	January 17, 2001	Socorro	LINEAR	URS	9.3 km	MPC · JPL
107152	2001 BX_{12}	—	January 18, 2001	Socorro	LINEAR	PHO	3.8 km	MPC · JPL
107153	2001 BW_{13}	—	January 18, 2001	Kitt Peak	Spacewatch	·	2.5 km	MPC · JPL
107154	2001 BN_{14}	—	January 21, 2001	Desert Beaver	W. K. Y. Yeung	·	2.5 km	MPC · JPL
107155	2001 BO_{14}	—	January 21, 2001	Desert Beaver	W. K. Y. Yeung	·	4.3 km	MPC · JPL
107156	2001 BF_{15}	—	January 21, 2001	Oizumi	T. Kobayashi	V	1.7 km	MPC · JPL
107157	2001 BR_{15}	—	January 21, 2001	Oizumi	T. Kobayashi	·	4.1 km	MPC · JPL
107158	2001 BU_{15}	—	January 21, 2001	Oizumi	T. Kobayashi	·	5.4 km	MPC · JPL
107159	2001 BP_{18}	—	January 19, 2001	Socorro	LINEAR	·	1.6 km	MPC · JPL
107160	2001 BV_{18}	—	January 19, 2001	Socorro	LINEAR	·	2.1 km	MPC · JPL
107161	2001 BY_{18}	—	January 19, 2001	Socorro	LINEAR	NYS	2.2 km	MPC · JPL
107162	2001 BV_{19}	—	January 19, 2001	Socorro	LINEAR	·	2.0 km	MPC · JPL
107163	2001 BZ_{19}	—	January 19, 2001	Socorro	LINEAR	·	1.8 km	MPC · JPL
107164	2001 BA_{20}	—	January 19, 2001	Socorro	LINEAR	·	2.7 km	MPC · JPL
107165	2001 BM_{20}	—	January 19, 2001	Socorro	LINEAR	·	1.2 km	MPC · JPL
107166	2001 BK_{21}	—	January 19, 2001	Socorro	LINEAR	V	1.1 km	MPC · JPL
107167	2001 BN_{21}	—	January 19, 2001	Socorro	LINEAR	·	1.9 km	MPC · JPL
107168	2001 BW_{21}	—	January 20, 2001	Socorro	LINEAR	·	1.9 km	MPC · JPL
107169	2001 BQ_{22}	—	January 20, 2001	Socorro	LINEAR	V	1.4 km	MPC · JPL
107170	2001 BB_{23}	—	January 20, 2001	Socorro	LINEAR	·	1.6 km	MPC · JPL
107171	2001 BC_{23}	—	January 20, 2001	Socorro	LINEAR	·	6.2 km	MPC · JPL
107172	2001 BM_{23}	—	January 20, 2001	Socorro	LINEAR	·	1.4 km	MPC · JPL
107173	2001 BT_{23}	—	January 20, 2001	Socorro	LINEAR	·	2.0 km	MPC · JPL
107174	2001 BY_{23}	—	January 20, 2001	Socorro	LINEAR	·	2.1 km	MPC · JPL
107175	2001 BZ_{23}	—	January 20, 2001	Socorro	LINEAR	·	1.5 km	MPC · JPL
107176	2001 BA_{24}	—	January 20, 2001	Socorro	LINEAR	·	2.4 km	MPC · JPL
107177	2001 BZ_{24}	—	January 20, 2001	Socorro	LINEAR	NYS	2.1 km	MPC · JPL
107178	2001 BE_{25}	—	January 20, 2001	Socorro	LINEAR	L4	20 km	MPC · JPL
107179	2001 BK_{25}	—	January 20, 2001	Socorro	LINEAR	NYS	2.0 km	MPC · JPL
107180	2001 BP_{25}	—	January 20, 2001	Socorro	LINEAR	·	2.4 km	MPC · JPL
107181	2001 BU_{25}	—	January 20, 2001	Socorro	LINEAR	T_{j} (2.98) · CYB	7.9 km	MPC · JPL
107182	2001 BA_{26}	—	January 20, 2001	Socorro	LINEAR	NYS	3.1 km	MPC · JPL
107183	2001 BE_{26}	—	January 20, 2001	Socorro	LINEAR	·	3.9 km	MPC · JPL
107184	2001 BH_{26}	—	January 20, 2001	Socorro	LINEAR	(1338) (FLO)	1.6 km	MPC · JPL
107185	2001 BN_{26}	—	January 20, 2001	Socorro	LINEAR	·	2.2 km	MPC · JPL
107186	2001 BR_{26}	—	January 20, 2001	Socorro	LINEAR	·	2.3 km	MPC · JPL
107187	2001 BW_{26}	—	January 20, 2001	Socorro	LINEAR	·	1.4 km	MPC · JPL
107188	2001 BB_{27}	—	January 20, 2001	Socorro	LINEAR	EUN	3.1 km	MPC · JPL
107189	2001 BP_{27}	—	January 20, 2001	Socorro	LINEAR	·	2.9 km	MPC · JPL
107190	2001 BN_{28}	—	January 20, 2001	Socorro	LINEAR	NYS	1.9 km	MPC · JPL
107191	2001 BS_{28}	—	January 20, 2001	Socorro	LINEAR	NYS	2.5 km	MPC · JPL
107192	2001 BZ_{28}	—	January 20, 2001	Socorro	LINEAR	MAS	1.2 km	MPC · JPL
107193	2001 BC_{30}	—	January 20, 2001	Socorro	LINEAR	·	1.6 km	MPC · JPL
107194	2001 BE_{30}	—	January 20, 2001	Socorro	LINEAR	·	1.2 km	MPC · JPL
107195	2001 BB_{31}	—	January 20, 2001	Socorro	LINEAR	·	2.2 km	MPC · JPL
107196	2001 BC_{31}	—	January 20, 2001	Socorro	LINEAR	·	2.6 km	MPC · JPL
107197	2001 BG_{31}	—	January 20, 2001	Socorro	LINEAR	·	2.7 km	MPC · JPL
107198	2001 BQ_{31}	—	January 20, 2001	Socorro	LINEAR	·	2.1 km	MPC · JPL
107199	2001 BA_{32}	—	January 20, 2001	Socorro	LINEAR	·	1.8 km	MPC · JPL
107200	2001 BB_{32}	—	January 20, 2001	Socorro	LINEAR	·	2.6 km	MPC · JPL

== 107201–107300 ==
back to top

Designation			Discovery			Properties		Ref
Permanent	Provisional	Named after	Date	Site	Discoverer(s)	Category	Diam.	Ref
107201	2001 BE_{32}	—	January 20, 2001	Socorro	LINEAR	·	2.5 km	MPC · JPL
107202	2001 BU_{32}	—	January 20, 2001	Socorro	LINEAR	·	2.1 km	MPC · JPL
107203	2001 BC_{33}	—	January 20, 2001	Socorro	LINEAR	·	2.6 km	MPC · JPL
107204	2001 BV_{33}	—	January 20, 2001	Socorro	LINEAR	·	2.6 km	MPC · JPL
107205	2001 BW_{33}	—	January 20, 2001	Socorro	LINEAR	·	1.9 km	MPC · JPL
107206	2001 BX_{34}	—	January 20, 2001	Socorro	LINEAR	·	1.6 km	MPC · JPL
107207	2001 BY_{34}	—	January 20, 2001	Socorro	LINEAR	V	1.4 km	MPC · JPL
107208	2001 BU_{35}	—	January 22, 2001	Haleakala	NEAT	PHO	2.0 km	MPC · JPL
107209	2001 BW_{39}	—	January 23, 2001	Kitt Peak	Spacewatch	·	1.4 km	MPC · JPL
107210	2001 BX_{39}	—	January 21, 2001	Haleakala	NEAT	·	2.2 km	MPC · JPL
107211	2001 BY_{40}	—	January 24, 2001	Socorro	LINEAR	·	3.4 km	MPC · JPL
107212	2001 BE_{41}	—	January 24, 2001	Socorro	LINEAR	·	1.9 km	MPC · JPL
107213	2001 BJ_{42}	—	January 25, 2001	Oaxaca	Roe, J. M.	·	2.0 km	MPC · JPL
107214	2001 BG_{43}	—	January 19, 2001	Socorro	LINEAR	·	2.4 km	MPC · JPL
107215	2001 BK_{43}	—	January 19, 2001	Socorro	LINEAR	·	2.6 km	MPC · JPL
107216	2001 BA_{44}	—	January 19, 2001	Socorro	LINEAR	·	5.1 km	MPC · JPL
107217	2001 BM_{45}	—	January 20, 2001	Socorro	LINEAR	·	2.3 km	MPC · JPL
107218	2001 BG_{46}	—	January 21, 2001	Socorro	LINEAR	·	2.6 km	MPC · JPL
107219	2001 BP_{47}	—	January 21, 2001	Socorro	LINEAR	ERI	3.4 km	MPC · JPL
107220	2001 BC_{48}	—	January 21, 2001	Socorro	LINEAR	·	2.1 km	MPC · JPL
107221	2001 BW_{48}	—	January 21, 2001	Socorro	LINEAR	·	3.0 km	MPC · JPL
107222	2001 BM_{49}	—	January 21, 2001	Socorro	LINEAR	ERI	3.5 km	MPC · JPL
107223 Ripero	2001 BU_{50}	Ripero	January 21, 2001	Pla D'Arguines	R. Ferrando	·	3.1 km	MPC · JPL
107224	2001 BZ_{50}	—	January 28, 2001	Oizumi	T. Kobayashi	·	5.6 km	MPC · JPL
107225	2001 BF_{51}	—	January 27, 2001	Haleakala	NEAT	·	1.6 km	MPC · JPL
107226	2001 BC_{52}	—	January 17, 2001	Kitt Peak	Spacewatch	MAS	1.0 km	MPC · JPL
107227	2001 BJ_{52}	—	January 17, 2001	Kitt Peak	Spacewatch	·	2.3 km	MPC · JPL
107228	2001 BS_{52}	—	January 17, 2001	Haleakala	NEAT	V	1.1 km	MPC · JPL
107229	2001 BA_{53}	—	January 17, 2001	Haleakala	NEAT	·	4.3 km	MPC · JPL
107230	2001 BF_{53}	—	January 17, 2001	Haleakala	NEAT	NYS	1.8 km	MPC · JPL
107231	2001 BW_{53}	—	January 18, 2001	Haleakala	NEAT	·	1.4 km	MPC · JPL
107232	2001 BA_{54}	—	January 18, 2001	Haleakala	NEAT	·	3.1 km	MPC · JPL
107233	2001 BE_{54}	—	January 18, 2001	Kitt Peak	Spacewatch	NYS	2.3 km	MPC · JPL
107234	2001 BL_{54}	—	January 18, 2001	Kitt Peak	Spacewatch	·	3.4 km	MPC · JPL
107235	2001 BR_{54}	—	January 18, 2001	Haleakala	NEAT	·	2.4 km	MPC · JPL
107236	2001 BM_{55}	—	January 19, 2001	Socorro	LINEAR	·	2.6 km	MPC · JPL
107237	2001 BB_{56}	—	January 19, 2001	Socorro	LINEAR	·	2.3 km	MPC · JPL
107238	2001 BH_{56}	—	January 19, 2001	Socorro	LINEAR	·	1.5 km	MPC · JPL
107239	2001 BS_{56}	—	January 19, 2001	Kitt Peak	Spacewatch	·	5.1 km	MPC · JPL
107240	2001 BS_{57}	—	January 20, 2001	Haleakala	NEAT	·	1.9 km	MPC · JPL
107241	2001 BE_{58}	—	January 21, 2001	Socorro	LINEAR	·	1.7 km	MPC · JPL
107242	2001 BH_{58}	—	January 21, 2001	Socorro	LINEAR	·	1.6 km	MPC · JPL
107243	2001 BJ_{58}	—	January 21, 2001	Socorro	LINEAR	·	2.1 km	MPC · JPL
107244	2001 BQ_{58}	—	January 21, 2001	Socorro	LINEAR	V	1.4 km	MPC · JPL
107245	2001 BW_{58}	—	January 21, 2001	Socorro	LINEAR	·	2.0 km	MPC · JPL
107246	2001 BY_{58}	—	January 21, 2001	Socorro	LINEAR	NYS	2.3 km	MPC · JPL
107247	2001 BB_{59}	—	January 21, 2001	Socorro	LINEAR	·	3.6 km	MPC · JPL
107248	2001 BC_{59}	—	January 21, 2001	Socorro	LINEAR	NYS	1.8 km	MPC · JPL
107249	2001 BE_{59}	—	January 21, 2001	Socorro	LINEAR	·	1.8 km	MPC · JPL
107250	2001 BJ_{59}	—	January 21, 2001	Socorro	LINEAR	·	3.3 km	MPC · JPL
107251	2001 BN_{59}	—	January 26, 2001	Socorro	LINEAR	·	1.8 km	MPC · JPL
107252	2001 BS_{59}	—	January 26, 2001	Socorro	LINEAR	·	4.6 km	MPC · JPL
107253	2001 BF_{62}	—	January 26, 2001	Socorro	LINEAR	·	2.2 km	MPC · JPL
107254	2001 BJ_{62}	—	January 26, 2001	Socorro	LINEAR	·	1.6 km	MPC · JPL
107255	2001 BQ_{62}	—	January 29, 2001	Socorro	LINEAR	·	2.2 km	MPC · JPL
107256	2001 BY_{62}	—	January 29, 2001	Socorro	LINEAR	·	2.2 km	MPC · JPL
107257	2001 BD_{63}	—	January 29, 2001	Socorro	LINEAR	·	2.3 km	MPC · JPL
107258	2001 BG_{63}	—	January 29, 2001	Socorro	LINEAR	·	4.7 km	MPC · JPL
107259	2001 BT_{63}	—	January 29, 2001	Socorro	LINEAR	·	1.7 km	MPC · JPL
107260	2001 BC_{64}	—	January 29, 2001	Socorro	LINEAR	GEF	2.4 km	MPC · JPL
107261	2001 BM_{64}	—	January 29, 2001	Socorro	LINEAR	PHO	2.1 km	MPC · JPL
107262	2001 BR_{64}	—	January 30, 2001	Socorro	LINEAR	V	1.3 km	MPC · JPL
107263	2001 BX_{65}	—	January 26, 2001	Socorro	LINEAR	·	2.3 km	MPC · JPL
107264	2001 BA_{68}	—	January 31, 2001	Socorro	LINEAR	NYS	2.9 km	MPC · JPL
107265	2001 BP_{68}	—	January 31, 2001	Socorro	LINEAR	·	1.7 km	MPC · JPL
107266	2001 BZ_{68}	—	January 31, 2001	Socorro	LINEAR	MAS	1.7 km	MPC · JPL
107267	2001 BA_{69}	—	January 31, 2001	Socorro	LINEAR	·	2.4 km	MPC · JPL
107268	2001 BS_{69}	—	January 31, 2001	Socorro	LINEAR	·	2.6 km	MPC · JPL
107269	2001 BF_{70}	—	January 31, 2001	Socorro	LINEAR	PHO	2.5 km	MPC · JPL
107270	2001 BN_{70}	—	January 21, 2001	Socorro	LINEAR	·	1.6 km	MPC · JPL
107271	2001 BL_{71}	—	January 29, 2001	Socorro	LINEAR	·	2.5 km	MPC · JPL
107272	2001 BO_{71}	—	January 29, 2001	Socorro	LINEAR	·	2.1 km	MPC · JPL
107273	2001 BT_{71}	—	January 29, 2001	Socorro	LINEAR	·	2.5 km	MPC · JPL
107274	2001 BX_{71}	—	January 31, 2001	Socorro	LINEAR	·	3.7 km	MPC · JPL
107275	2001 BZ_{71}	—	January 31, 2001	Socorro	LINEAR	·	3.0 km	MPC · JPL
107276	2001 BM_{72}	—	January 29, 2001	Socorro	LINEAR	NYS	1.5 km	MPC · JPL
107277	2001 BA_{73}	—	January 27, 2001	Haleakala	NEAT	·	4.7 km	MPC · JPL
107278	2001 BL_{73}	—	January 29, 2001	Carbuncle Hill	W. K. Y. Yeung	·	2.0 km	MPC · JPL
107279	2001 BP_{73}	—	January 29, 2001	Haleakala	NEAT	·	2.8 km	MPC · JPL
107280	2001 BU_{74}	—	January 31, 2001	Socorro	LINEAR	·	2.6 km	MPC · JPL
107281	2001 BH_{75}	—	January 26, 2001	Kitt Peak	Spacewatch	NYS	2.3 km	MPC · JPL
107282	2001 BL_{75}	—	January 26, 2001	Kitt Peak	Spacewatch	·	3.3 km	MPC · JPL
107283	2001 BG_{76}	—	January 26, 2001	Socorro	LINEAR	PHO	2.4 km	MPC · JPL
107284	2001 BL_{76}	—	January 26, 2001	Socorro	LINEAR	·	2.6 km	MPC · JPL
107285	2001 BN_{76}	—	January 26, 2001	Socorro	LINEAR	·	2.0 km	MPC · JPL
107286	2001 BU_{76}	—	January 26, 2001	Kitt Peak	Spacewatch	MAS	1.3 km	MPC · JPL
107287	2001 BE_{79}	—	January 21, 2001	Socorro	LINEAR	NYS	2.0 km	MPC · JPL
107288	2001 BK_{79}	—	January 21, 2001	Socorro	LINEAR	·	2.0 km	MPC · JPL
107289	2001 BM_{82}	—	January 26, 2001	Socorro	LINEAR	·	2.5 km	MPC · JPL
107290	2001 CA	—	February 1, 2001	Črni Vrh	Črni Vrh	NYS	2.1 km	MPC · JPL
107291	2001 CF	—	February 1, 2001	Višnjan Observatory	K. Korlević	·	3.7 km	MPC · JPL
107292	2001 CZ	—	February 1, 2001	Socorro	LINEAR	·	1.9 km	MPC · JPL
107293	2001 CF_{1}	—	February 1, 2001	Socorro	LINEAR	·	2.5 km	MPC · JPL
107294	2001 CR_{1}	—	February 1, 2001	Socorro	LINEAR	(5)	2.6 km	MPC · JPL
107295	2001 CG_{3}	—	February 1, 2001	Socorro	LINEAR	NYS	2.5 km	MPC · JPL
107296	2001 CS_{3}	—	February 1, 2001	Socorro	LINEAR	DOR	5.6 km	MPC · JPL
107297	2001 CD_{4}	—	February 1, 2001	Socorro	LINEAR	·	4.8 km	MPC · JPL
107298	2001 CH_{4}	—	February 1, 2001	Socorro	LINEAR	(194)	3.0 km	MPC · JPL
107299	2001 CX_{4}	—	February 1, 2001	Socorro	LINEAR	·	2.7 km	MPC · JPL
107300	2001 CZ_{5}	—	February 1, 2001	Socorro	LINEAR	·	2.7 km	MPC · JPL

== 107301–107400 ==
back to top

Designation			Discovery			Properties		Ref
Permanent	Provisional	Named after	Date	Site	Discoverer(s)	Category	Diam.	Ref
107301	2001 CC_{6}	—	February 1, 2001	Socorro	LINEAR	·	2.0 km	MPC · JPL
107302	2001 CD_{6}	—	February 1, 2001	Socorro	LINEAR	·	1.8 km	MPC · JPL
107303	2001 CE_{6}	—	February 1, 2001	Socorro	LINEAR	NYS	2.5 km	MPC · JPL
107304	2001 CF_{7}	—	February 1, 2001	Socorro	LINEAR	·	1.4 km	MPC · JPL
107305	2001 CM_{7}	—	February 1, 2001	Socorro	LINEAR	·	2.4 km	MPC · JPL
107306	2001 CX_{7}	—	February 1, 2001	Socorro	LINEAR	·	2.2 km	MPC · JPL
107307	2001 CE_{8}	—	February 1, 2001	Socorro	LINEAR	·	1.9 km	MPC · JPL
107308	2001 CR_{8}	—	February 1, 2001	Socorro	LINEAR	·	1.7 km	MPC · JPL
107309	2001 CU_{8}	—	February 1, 2001	Socorro	LINEAR	·	1.5 km	MPC · JPL
107310	2001 CF_{9}	—	February 1, 2001	Socorro	LINEAR	·	1.7 km	MPC · JPL
107311	2001 CY_{9}	—	February 2, 2001	Oaxaca	Roe, J. M.	·	1.7 km	MPC · JPL
107312	2001 CA_{10}	—	February 3, 2001	Piera	Guarro, J.	·	3.2 km	MPC · JPL
107313	2001 CW_{10}	—	February 1, 2001	Socorro	LINEAR	NYS	2.0 km	MPC · JPL
107314	2001 CC_{11}	—	February 1, 2001	Socorro	LINEAR	·	1.8 km	MPC · JPL
107315	2001 CJ_{11}	—	February 1, 2001	Socorro	LINEAR	·	1.1 km	MPC · JPL
107316	2001 CQ_{11}	—	February 1, 2001	Socorro	LINEAR	·	2.7 km	MPC · JPL
107317	2001 CU_{11}	—	February 1, 2001	Socorro	LINEAR	·	3.6 km	MPC · JPL
107318	2001 CE_{12}	—	February 1, 2001	Socorro	LINEAR	·	2.0 km	MPC · JPL
107319	2001 CL_{12}	—	February 1, 2001	Socorro	LINEAR	NYS	2.5 km	MPC · JPL
107320	2001 CC_{13}	—	February 1, 2001	Socorro	LINEAR	·	2.6 km	MPC · JPL
107321	2001 CL_{13}	—	February 1, 2001	Socorro	LINEAR	·	7.0 km	MPC · JPL
107322	2001 CF_{14}	—	February 1, 2001	Socorro	LINEAR	·	3.6 km	MPC · JPL
107323	2001 CH_{14}	—	February 1, 2001	Socorro	LINEAR	MAS	1.9 km	MPC · JPL
107324	2001 CM_{14}	—	February 1, 2001	Socorro	LINEAR	(2076)	1.3 km	MPC · JPL
107325	2001 CE_{15}	—	February 1, 2001	Socorro	LINEAR	·	2.5 km	MPC · JPL
107326	2001 CM_{15}	—	February 1, 2001	Socorro	LINEAR	·	1.9 km	MPC · JPL
107327	2001 CU_{15}	—	February 1, 2001	Socorro	LINEAR	·	2.1 km	MPC · JPL
107328	2001 CM_{16}	—	February 1, 2001	Socorro	LINEAR	EUN	2.9 km	MPC · JPL
107329	2001 CR_{16}	—	February 1, 2001	Socorro	LINEAR	·	1.7 km	MPC · JPL
107330	2001 CN_{17}	—	February 1, 2001	Socorro	LINEAR	·	1.8 km	MPC · JPL
107331	2001 CT_{17}	—	February 1, 2001	Socorro	LINEAR	·	2.6 km	MPC · JPL
107332	2001 CX_{17}	—	February 2, 2001	Socorro	LINEAR	·	3.1 km	MPC · JPL
107333	2001 CM_{18}	—	February 2, 2001	Socorro	LINEAR	·	1.2 km	MPC · JPL
107334	2001 CH_{19}	—	February 2, 2001	Socorro	LINEAR	·	1.6 km	MPC · JPL
107335	2001 CL_{19}	—	February 2, 2001	Socorro	LINEAR	MAS	1.2 km	MPC · JPL
107336	2001 CA_{20}	—	February 2, 2001	Socorro	LINEAR	·	1.2 km	MPC · JPL
107337	2001 CE_{22}	—	February 1, 2001	Anderson Mesa	LONEOS	·	2.0 km	MPC · JPL
107338	2001 CG_{22}	—	February 1, 2001	Anderson Mesa	LONEOS	·	2.6 km	MPC · JPL
107339	2001 CT_{22}	—	February 1, 2001	Anderson Mesa	LONEOS	KOR	3.1 km	MPC · JPL
107340	2001 CB_{23}	—	February 1, 2001	Anderson Mesa	LONEOS	·	3.1 km	MPC · JPL
107341	2001 CE_{23}	—	February 1, 2001	Anderson Mesa	LONEOS	·	5.2 km	MPC · JPL
107342	2001 CO_{23}	—	February 1, 2001	Anderson Mesa	LONEOS	·	2.1 km	MPC · JPL
107343	2001 CP_{23}	—	February 1, 2001	Anderson Mesa	LONEOS	MAS	1.4 km	MPC · JPL
107344	2001 CV_{23}	—	February 1, 2001	Anderson Mesa	LONEOS	NYS	2.7 km	MPC · JPL
107345	2001 CM_{24}	—	February 1, 2001	Anderson Mesa	LONEOS	EUN	2.0 km	MPC · JPL
107346	2001 CP_{24}	—	February 1, 2001	Anderson Mesa	LONEOS	·	2.4 km	MPC · JPL
107347	2001 CG_{25}	—	February 1, 2001	Socorro	LINEAR	·	4.8 km	MPC · JPL
107348	2001 CN_{25}	—	February 1, 2001	Socorro	LINEAR	NYS	1.8 km	MPC · JPL
107349	2001 CW_{25}	—	February 1, 2001	Socorro	LINEAR	·	3.0 km	MPC · JPL
107350	2001 CA_{26}	—	February 1, 2001	Socorro	LINEAR	·	1.4 km	MPC · JPL
107351	2001 CK_{26}	—	February 1, 2001	Socorro	LINEAR	·	2.2 km	MPC · JPL
107352	2001 CQ_{26}	—	February 1, 2001	Kitt Peak	Spacewatch	·	2.3 km	MPC · JPL
107353	2001 CR_{26}	—	February 1, 2001	Kitt Peak	Spacewatch	MAS	1.3 km	MPC · JPL
107354	2001 CJ_{27}	—	February 2, 2001	Anderson Mesa	LONEOS	·	3.1 km	MPC · JPL
107355	2001 CP_{27}	—	February 2, 2001	Anderson Mesa	LONEOS	·	2.5 km	MPC · JPL
107356	2001 CU_{27}	—	February 2, 2001	Anderson Mesa	LONEOS	·	3.0 km	MPC · JPL
107357	2001 CB_{28}	—	February 2, 2001	Anderson Mesa	LONEOS	·	6.1 km	MPC · JPL
107358	2001 CH_{28}	—	February 2, 2001	Anderson Mesa	LONEOS	·	4.2 km	MPC · JPL
107359	2001 CL_{28}	—	February 2, 2001	Anderson Mesa	LONEOS	slow	1.6 km	MPC · JPL
107360	2001 CQ_{28}	—	February 2, 2001	Anderson Mesa	LONEOS	·	1.9 km	MPC · JPL
107361	2001 CX_{28}	—	February 2, 2001	Anderson Mesa	LONEOS	·	1.8 km	MPC · JPL
107362	2001 CG_{29}	—	February 2, 2001	Anderson Mesa	LONEOS	BRG	2.5 km	MPC · JPL
107363	2001 CJ_{29}	—	February 2, 2001	Anderson Mesa	LONEOS	·	2.3 km	MPC · JPL
107364	2001 CL_{29}	—	February 2, 2001	Anderson Mesa	LONEOS	PHO	1.3 km	MPC · JPL
107365	2001 CQ_{29}	—	February 2, 2001	Anderson Mesa	LONEOS	·	1.9 km	MPC · JPL
107366	2001 CR_{29}	—	February 2, 2001	Anderson Mesa	LONEOS	KOR	2.8 km	MPC · JPL
107367	2001 CG_{30}	—	February 2, 2001	Anderson Mesa	LONEOS	V	1.4 km	MPC · JPL
107368	2001 CH_{30}	—	February 2, 2001	Anderson Mesa	LONEOS	·	2.1 km	MPC · JPL
107369	2001 CL_{30}	—	February 2, 2001	Anderson Mesa	LONEOS	·	5.0 km	MPC · JPL
107370	2001 CQ_{30}	—	February 2, 2001	Haleakala	NEAT	·	5.1 km	MPC · JPL
107371	2001 CN_{31}	—	February 12, 2001	Prescott	P. G. Comba	·	2.7 km	MPC · JPL
107372	2001 CP_{31}	—	February 2, 2001	Socorro	LINEAR	·	2.3 km	MPC · JPL
107373	2001 CR_{31}	—	February 5, 2001	Socorro	LINEAR	H	1.4 km	MPC · JPL
107374	2001 CF_{34}	—	February 13, 2001	Socorro	LINEAR	EUN	2.9 km	MPC · JPL
107375	2001 CK_{34}	—	February 13, 2001	Socorro	LINEAR	·	2.7 km	MPC · JPL
107376	2001 CG_{36}	—	February 15, 2001	Oizumi	T. Kobayashi	·	1.9 km	MPC · JPL
107377	2001 CL_{36}	—	February 15, 2001	Oizumi	T. Kobayashi	V	1.4 km	MPC · JPL
107378	2001 CU_{36}	—	February 13, 2001	Kitt Peak	Spacewatch	PHO	2.4 km	MPC · JPL
107379 Johnlogan	2001 CG_{37}	Johnlogan	February 15, 2001	Nogales	Tenagra II	·	3.2 km	MPC · JPL
107380	2001 CY_{38}	—	February 13, 2001	Socorro	LINEAR	·	4.8 km	MPC · JPL
107381	2001 CP_{39}	—	February 13, 2001	Socorro	LINEAR	(2076)	2.5 km	MPC · JPL
107382	2001 CT_{39}	—	February 13, 2001	Socorro	LINEAR	·	1.8 km	MPC · JPL
107383	2001 CN_{40}	—	February 15, 2001	Socorro	LINEAR	·	2.6 km	MPC · JPL
107384	2001 CC_{41}	—	February 15, 2001	Socorro	LINEAR	·	5.1 km	MPC · JPL
107385	2001 CL_{41}	—	February 15, 2001	Črni Vrh	Mikuž, H.	·	2.0 km	MPC · JPL
107386	2001 CS_{42}	—	February 13, 2001	Socorro	LINEAR	·	2.1 km	MPC · JPL
107387	2001 CU_{42}	—	February 13, 2001	Socorro	LINEAR	·	1.8 km	MPC · JPL
107388	2001 CY_{43}	—	February 15, 2001	Socorro	LINEAR	·	3.7 km	MPC · JPL
107389	2001 CQ_{44}	—	February 15, 2001	Socorro	LINEAR	·	4.8 km	MPC · JPL
107390	2001 CT_{45}	—	February 15, 2001	Socorro	LINEAR	MAR	2.3 km	MPC · JPL
107391	2001 CW_{45}	—	February 15, 2001	Socorro	LINEAR	·	2.7 km	MPC · JPL
107392	2001 CZ_{45}	—	February 15, 2001	Socorro	LINEAR	·	2.1 km	MPC · JPL
107393 Bernacca	2001 CJ_{48}	Bernacca	February 1, 2001	Cima Ekar	ADAS	KOR	2.6 km	MPC · JPL
107394	2001 CJ_{49}	—	February 2, 2001	Cima Ekar	ADAS	·	2.3 km	MPC · JPL
107395	2001 CR_{49}	—	February 2, 2001	Socorro	LINEAR	·	4.7 km	MPC · JPL
107396 Swangin	2001 DU	Swangin	February 16, 2001	Nogales	Tenagra II	·	3.3 km	MPC · JPL
107397	2001 DY	—	February 16, 2001	Nogales	Tenagra II	·	2.1 km	MPC · JPL
107398	2001 DA_{1}	—	February 16, 2001	Nogales	Tenagra II	NYS	4.2 km	MPC · JPL
107399	2001 DJ_{1}	—	February 16, 2001	Kitt Peak	Spacewatch	·	1.1 km	MPC · JPL
107400	2001 DP_{2}	—	February 16, 2001	Kitt Peak	Spacewatch	·	1.7 km	MPC · JPL

== 107401–107500 ==
back to top

Designation			Discovery			Properties		Ref
Permanent	Provisional	Named after	Date	Site	Discoverer(s)	Category	Diam.	Ref
107401	2001 DS_{2}	—	February 16, 2001	Prescott	P. G. Comba	NYS	2.1 km	MPC · JPL
107402	2001 DW_{2}	—	February 16, 2001	Socorro	LINEAR	H	1.1 km	MPC · JPL
107403	2001 DW_{3}	—	February 16, 2001	Socorro	LINEAR	V	1.3 km	MPC · JPL
107404	2001 DA_{5}	—	February 16, 2001	Socorro	LINEAR	·	1.4 km	MPC · JPL
107405	2001 DS_{5}	—	February 16, 2001	Socorro	LINEAR	·	1.8 km	MPC · JPL
107406	2001 DG_{6}	—	February 16, 2001	Socorro	LINEAR	·	1.6 km	MPC · JPL
107407	2001 DS_{6}	—	February 17, 2001	Višnjan Observatory	K. Korlević	NYS	2.1 km	MPC · JPL
107408	2001 DZ_{6}	—	February 16, 2001	Črni Vrh	Matičič, S.	·	2.3 km	MPC · JPL
107409	2001 DS_{7}	—	February 16, 2001	Črni Vrh	Matičič, S.	·	2.1 km	MPC · JPL
107410	2001 DV_{7}	—	February 17, 2001	Črni Vrh	Skvarč, J.	NYS	1.8 km	MPC · JPL
107411	2001 DG_{8}	—	February 17, 2001	Kitt Peak	Spacewatch	MAS	1.3 km	MPC · JPL
107412	2001 DX_{8}	—	February 16, 2001	Socorro	LINEAR	H	940 m	MPC · JPL
107413	2001 DE_{9}	—	February 17, 2001	Socorro	LINEAR	PHO	2.1 km	MPC · JPL
107414	2001 DS_{9}	—	February 16, 2001	Socorro	LINEAR	·	7.8 km	MPC · JPL
107415	2001 DU_{9}	—	February 16, 2001	Socorro	LINEAR	V	1.3 km	MPC · JPL
107416	2001 DX_{9}	—	February 16, 2001	Socorro	LINEAR	·	2.1 km	MPC · JPL
107417	2001 DZ_{9}	—	February 16, 2001	Socorro	LINEAR	V	1.5 km	MPC · JPL
107418	2001 DH_{10}	—	February 17, 2001	Socorro	LINEAR	ERI	2.6 km	MPC · JPL
107419	2001 DV_{10}	—	February 17, 2001	Socorro	LINEAR	·	2.4 km	MPC · JPL
107420	2001 DC_{11}	—	February 17, 2001	Socorro	LINEAR	·	1.5 km	MPC · JPL
107421	2001 DF_{11}	—	February 17, 2001	Socorro	LINEAR	MAS	1.2 km	MPC · JPL
107422	2001 DO_{11}	—	February 17, 2001	Socorro	LINEAR	·	2.0 km	MPC · JPL
107423	2001 DR_{11}	—	February 17, 2001	Socorro	LINEAR	·	2.1 km	MPC · JPL
107424	2001 DC_{12}	—	February 17, 2001	Socorro	LINEAR	HOF	6.9 km	MPC · JPL
107425	2001 DF_{12}	—	February 17, 2001	Socorro	LINEAR	NYS	3.1 km	MPC · JPL
107426	2001 DL_{13}	—	February 19, 2001	Oizumi	T. Kobayashi	·	2.5 km	MPC · JPL
107427	2001 DM_{13}	—	February 19, 2001	Oizumi	T. Kobayashi	·	2.6 km	MPC · JPL
107428	2001 DP_{13}	—	February 19, 2001	Oizumi	T. Kobayashi	·	2.0 km	MPC · JPL
107429	2001 DQ_{13}	—	February 19, 2001	Oizumi	T. Kobayashi	·	2.9 km	MPC · JPL
107430	2001 DU_{13}	—	February 19, 2001	Oizumi	T. Kobayashi	·	5.7 km	MPC · JPL
107431	2001 DD_{14}	—	February 19, 2001	Socorro	LINEAR	H	1.2 km	MPC · JPL
107432	2001 DM_{14}	—	February 19, 2001	Socorro	LINEAR	·	1.3 km	MPC · JPL
107433	2001 DW_{14}	—	February 16, 2001	Črni Vrh	Matičič, S.	NYS	1.7 km	MPC · JPL
107434	2001 DA_{15}	—	February 17, 2001	Črni Vrh	Matičič, S.	·	2.5 km	MPC · JPL
107435	2001 DL_{15}	—	February 16, 2001	Socorro	LINEAR	·	2.1 km	MPC · JPL
107436	2001 DS_{15}	—	February 16, 2001	Socorro	LINEAR	·	3.1 km	MPC · JPL
107437	2001 DC_{16}	—	February 16, 2001	Socorro	LINEAR	·	1.6 km	MPC · JPL
107438	2001 DK_{16}	—	February 16, 2001	Socorro	LINEAR	·	2.3 km	MPC · JPL
107439	2001 DL_{16}	—	February 16, 2001	Socorro	LINEAR	·	4.0 km	MPC · JPL
107440	2001 DQ_{16}	—	February 16, 2001	Socorro	LINEAR	V	1.2 km	MPC · JPL
107441	2001 DE_{17}	—	February 16, 2001	Socorro	LINEAR	·	2.1 km	MPC · JPL
107442	2001 DR_{17}	—	February 16, 2001	Socorro	LINEAR	·	2.3 km	MPC · JPL
107443	2001 DX_{17}	—	February 16, 2001	Socorro	LINEAR	·	3.4 km	MPC · JPL
107444	2001 DF_{18}	—	February 16, 2001	Socorro	LINEAR	·	1.7 km	MPC · JPL
107445	2001 DR_{18}	—	February 16, 2001	Socorro	LINEAR	RAF	1.8 km	MPC · JPL
107446	2001 DO_{19}	—	February 16, 2001	Socorro	LINEAR	·	2.1 km	MPC · JPL
107447	2001 DR_{19}	—	February 16, 2001	Socorro	LINEAR	·	2.4 km	MPC · JPL
107448	2001 DS_{19}	—	February 16, 2001	Socorro	LINEAR	LUT	8.6 km	MPC · JPL
107449	2001 DB_{20}	—	February 16, 2001	Socorro	LINEAR	·	2.2 km	MPC · JPL
107450	2001 DE_{20}	—	February 16, 2001	Socorro	LINEAR	MRX	1.8 km	MPC · JPL
107451	2001 DG_{20}	—	February 16, 2001	Socorro	LINEAR	PHO	1.3 km	MPC · JPL
107452	2001 DA_{21}	—	February 16, 2001	Socorro	LINEAR	·	2.4 km	MPC · JPL
107453	2001 DQ_{23}	—	February 17, 2001	Socorro	LINEAR	NYS	1.7 km	MPC · JPL
107454	2001 DR_{23}	—	February 17, 2001	Socorro	LINEAR	·	1.8 km	MPC · JPL
107455	2001 DD_{24}	—	February 17, 2001	Socorro	LINEAR	·	2.3 km	MPC · JPL
107456	2001 DF_{24}	—	February 17, 2001	Socorro	LINEAR	NYS	1.9 km	MPC · JPL
107457	2001 DS_{24}	—	February 17, 2001	Socorro	LINEAR	·	2.6 km	MPC · JPL
107458	2001 DN_{26}	—	February 17, 2001	Socorro	LINEAR	NYS	2.5 km	MPC · JPL
107459	2001 DP_{26}	—	February 17, 2001	Socorro	LINEAR	·	4.4 km	MPC · JPL
107460	2001 DV_{26}	—	February 17, 2001	Socorro	LINEAR	MAS	1.5 km	MPC · JPL
107461	2001 DS_{27}	—	February 17, 2001	Socorro	LINEAR	V	1.1 km	MPC · JPL
107462	2001 DE_{28}	—	February 17, 2001	Socorro	LINEAR	·	2.1 km	MPC · JPL
107463	2001 DG_{28}	—	February 17, 2001	Socorro	LINEAR	·	2.5 km	MPC · JPL
107464	2001 DJ_{28}	—	February 17, 2001	Socorro	LINEAR	·	1.3 km	MPC · JPL
107465	2001 DN_{28}	—	February 17, 2001	Socorro	LINEAR	MRX	2.7 km	MPC · JPL
107466	2001 DV_{28}	—	February 17, 2001	Socorro	LINEAR	·	3.2 km	MPC · JPL
107467	2001 DY_{28}	—	February 17, 2001	Socorro	LINEAR	MAS	1.9 km	MPC · JPL
107468	2001 DX_{29}	—	February 17, 2001	Socorro	LINEAR	·	2.1 km	MPC · JPL
107469	2001 DB_{30}	—	February 17, 2001	Socorro	LINEAR	ERI	3.9 km	MPC · JPL
107470	2001 DO_{31}	—	February 17, 2001	Socorro	LINEAR	·	3.2 km	MPC · JPL
107471	2001 DT_{31}	—	February 17, 2001	Socorro	LINEAR	NYS	2.2 km	MPC · JPL
107472	2001 DB_{32}	—	February 17, 2001	Socorro	LINEAR	NYS	2.3 km	MPC · JPL
107473	2001 DZ_{32}	—	February 17, 2001	Socorro	LINEAR	·	2.8 km	MPC · JPL
107474	2001 DE_{33}	—	February 17, 2001	Socorro	LINEAR	·	3.7 km	MPC · JPL
107475	2001 DK_{33}	—	February 17, 2001	Socorro	LINEAR	·	2.1 km	MPC · JPL
107476	2001 DL_{33}	—	February 17, 2001	Socorro	LINEAR	·	4.0 km	MPC · JPL
107477	2001 DW_{33}	—	February 17, 2001	Socorro	LINEAR	·	2.7 km	MPC · JPL
107478	2001 DX_{34}	—	February 19, 2001	Socorro	LINEAR	·	1.6 km	MPC · JPL
107479	2001 DK_{35}	—	February 19, 2001	Socorro	LINEAR	·	1.6 km	MPC · JPL
107480	2001 DS_{35}	—	February 19, 2001	Socorro	LINEAR	·	1.8 km	MPC · JPL
107481	2001 DH_{36}	—	February 19, 2001	Socorro	LINEAR	MAS	1.3 km	MPC · JPL
107482	2001 DP_{36}	—	February 19, 2001	Socorro	LINEAR	(5)	2.4 km	MPC · JPL
107483	2001 DQ_{36}	—	February 19, 2001	Socorro	LINEAR	·	3.2 km	MPC · JPL
107484	2001 DS_{36}	—	February 19, 2001	Socorro	LINEAR	·	4.1 km	MPC · JPL
107485	2001 DG_{37}	—	February 19, 2001	Socorro	LINEAR	·	1.9 km	MPC · JPL
107486	2001 DL_{37}	—	February 19, 2001	Socorro	LINEAR	MAR · fast	2.2 km	MPC · JPL
107487	2001 DN_{37}	—	February 19, 2001	Socorro	LINEAR	·	2.3 km	MPC · JPL
107488	2001 DR_{37}	—	February 19, 2001	Socorro	LINEAR	·	2.0 km	MPC · JPL
107489	2001 DB_{38}	—	February 19, 2001	Socorro	LINEAR	·	1.6 km	MPC · JPL
107490	2001 DR_{39}	—	February 19, 2001	Socorro	LINEAR	·	5.3 km	MPC · JPL
107491	2001 DB_{41}	—	February 19, 2001	Socorro	LINEAR	·	3.4 km	MPC · JPL
107492	2001 DK_{41}	—	February 19, 2001	Socorro	LINEAR	(2076)	1.6 km	MPC · JPL
107493	2001 DE_{43}	—	February 19, 2001	Socorro	LINEAR	·	2.2 km	MPC · JPL
107494	2001 DM_{43}	—	February 19, 2001	Socorro	LINEAR	·	1.3 km	MPC · JPL
107495	2001 DP_{43}	—	February 19, 2001	Socorro	LINEAR	NYS	2.2 km	MPC · JPL
107496	2001 DS_{43}	—	February 19, 2001	Socorro	LINEAR	MAS	1.6 km	MPC · JPL
107497	2001 DO_{44}	—	February 19, 2001	Socorro	LINEAR	V	1.1 km	MPC · JPL
107498	2001 DQ_{44}	—	February 19, 2001	Socorro	LINEAR	MAS	1.5 km	MPC · JPL
107499	2001 DZ_{45}	—	February 19, 2001	Socorro	LINEAR	·	3.5 km	MPC · JPL
107500	2001 DJ_{46}	—	February 19, 2001	Socorro	LINEAR	·	1.3 km	MPC · JPL

== 107501–107600 ==
back to top

Designation			Discovery			Properties		Ref
Permanent	Provisional	Named after	Date	Site	Discoverer(s)	Category	Diam.	Ref
107501	2001 DP_{46}	—	February 19, 2001	Socorro	LINEAR	·	1.2 km	MPC · JPL
107502	2001 DX_{47}	—	February 20, 2001	Socorro	LINEAR	H	1.1 km	MPC · JPL
107503	2001 DM_{48}	—	February 16, 2001	Socorro	LINEAR	·	1.9 km	MPC · JPL
107504	2001 DQ_{48}	—	February 16, 2001	Socorro	LINEAR	·	1.8 km	MPC · JPL
107505	2001 DK_{49}	—	February 16, 2001	Socorro	LINEAR	·	1.8 km	MPC · JPL
107506	2001 DM_{49}	—	February 16, 2001	Socorro	LINEAR	·	2.3 km	MPC · JPL
107507	2001 DP_{49}	—	February 16, 2001	Socorro	LINEAR	·	2.6 km	MPC · JPL
107508	2001 DV_{49}	—	February 16, 2001	Socorro	LINEAR	V	1.5 km	MPC · JPL
107509	2001 DC_{50}	—	February 16, 2001	Socorro	LINEAR	·	1.4 km	MPC · JPL
107510	2001 DK_{50}	—	February 16, 2001	Socorro	LINEAR	MAR	2.6 km	MPC · JPL
107511	2001 DF_{52}	—	February 16, 2001	Socorro	LINEAR	·	1.7 km	MPC · JPL
107512	2001 DB_{53}	—	February 17, 2001	Socorro	LINEAR	·	2.8 km	MPC · JPL
107513	2001 DO_{53}	—	February 20, 2001	Socorro	LINEAR	·	2.5 km	MPC · JPL
107514	2001 DW_{53}	—	February 20, 2001	Črni Vrh	Matičič, S.	·	2.2 km	MPC · JPL
107515	2001 DZ_{53}	—	February 21, 2001	Kitt Peak	Spacewatch	·	1.5 km	MPC · JPL
107516	2001 DC_{54}	—	February 21, 2001	Kitt Peak	Spacewatch	·	1.2 km	MPC · JPL
107517	2001 DM_{54}	—	February 19, 2001	Oizumi	T. Kobayashi	·	1.9 km	MPC · JPL
107518	2001 DN_{56}	—	February 16, 2001	Kitt Peak	Spacewatch	MAS	1.4 km	MPC · JPL
107519	2001 DO_{57}	—	February 17, 2001	Kitt Peak	Spacewatch	MAS	1.2 km	MPC · JPL
107520	2001 DF_{58}	—	February 17, 2001	Haleakala	NEAT	·	2.5 km	MPC · JPL
107521	2001 DV_{60}	—	February 19, 2001	Socorro	LINEAR	NYS	2.1 km	MPC · JPL
107522	2001 DY_{60}	—	February 19, 2001	Socorro	LINEAR	EUN · slow	2.7 km	MPC · JPL
107523	2001 DZ_{60}	—	February 19, 2001	Socorro	LINEAR	·	1.8 km	MPC · JPL
107524	2001 DB_{61}	—	February 19, 2001	Socorro	LINEAR	·	1.5 km	MPC · JPL
107525	2001 DG_{61}	—	February 19, 2001	Socorro	LINEAR	·	2.8 km	MPC · JPL
107526	2001 DH_{61}	—	February 19, 2001	Socorro	LINEAR	·	2.0 km	MPC · JPL
107527	2001 DP_{61}	—	February 19, 2001	Socorro	LINEAR	NYS	1.7 km	MPC · JPL
107528	2001 DQ_{62}	—	February 19, 2001	Socorro	LINEAR	NYS	2.0 km	MPC · JPL
107529	2001 DB_{65}	—	February 19, 2001	Socorro	LINEAR	·	1.7 km	MPC · JPL
107530	2001 DE_{65}	—	February 19, 2001	Socorro	LINEAR	NYS	1.9 km	MPC · JPL
107531	2001 DR_{65}	—	February 19, 2001	Socorro	LINEAR	·	2.3 km	MPC · JPL
107532	2001 DZ_{66}	—	February 19, 2001	Socorro	LINEAR	·	2.1 km	MPC · JPL
107533	2001 DF_{67}	—	February 19, 2001	Socorro	LINEAR	·	2.6 km	MPC · JPL
107534	2001 DR_{67}	—	February 19, 2001	Socorro	LINEAR	·	2.3 km	MPC · JPL
107535	2001 DB_{68}	—	February 19, 2001	Socorro	LINEAR	V	1.4 km	MPC · JPL
107536	2001 DC_{68}	—	February 19, 2001	Socorro	LINEAR	·	1.5 km	MPC · JPL
107537	2001 DO_{69}	—	February 19, 2001	Socorro	LINEAR	·	5.4 km	MPC · JPL
107538	2001 DR_{69}	—	February 19, 2001	Socorro	LINEAR	·	3.1 km	MPC · JPL
107539	2001 DB_{70}	—	February 19, 2001	Socorro	LINEAR	·	3.8 km	MPC · JPL
107540	2001 DF_{70}	—	February 19, 2001	Socorro	LINEAR	·	2.3 km	MPC · JPL
107541	2001 DG_{70}	—	February 19, 2001	Socorro	LINEAR	EUN	2.6 km	MPC · JPL
107542	2001 DO_{70}	—	February 19, 2001	Socorro	LINEAR	·	3.9 km	MPC · JPL
107543	2001 DQ_{70}	—	February 19, 2001	Socorro	LINEAR	V	1.2 km	MPC · JPL
107544	2001 DR_{70}	—	February 19, 2001	Socorro	LINEAR	·	5.9 km	MPC · JPL
107545	2001 DB_{71}	—	February 19, 2001	Socorro	LINEAR	·	3.5 km	MPC · JPL
107546	2001 DG_{71}	—	February 19, 2001	Socorro	LINEAR	·	2.9 km	MPC · JPL
107547	2001 DS_{71}	—	February 19, 2001	Socorro	LINEAR	·	1.5 km	MPC · JPL
107548	2001 DV_{71}	—	February 19, 2001	Socorro	LINEAR	RAF	1.7 km	MPC · JPL
107549	2001 DU_{72}	—	February 19, 2001	Socorro	LINEAR	·	2.0 km	MPC · JPL
107550	2001 DO_{74}	—	February 19, 2001	Socorro	LINEAR	PHO	4.3 km	MPC · JPL
107551	2001 DY_{74}	—	February 19, 2001	Socorro	LINEAR	·	2.1 km	MPC · JPL
107552	2001 DT_{77}	—	February 22, 2001	Kitt Peak	Spacewatch	MAS	1.4 km	MPC · JPL
107553	2001 DU_{78}	—	February 22, 2001	Kitt Peak	Spacewatch	·	1.5 km	MPC · JPL
107554	2001 DY_{78}	—	February 16, 2001	Socorro	LINEAR	·	2.4 km	MPC · JPL
107555	2001 DH_{80}	—	February 19, 2001	Ondřejov	P. Pravec, P. Kušnirák	·	1.9 km	MPC · JPL
107556	2001 DF_{81}	—	February 26, 2001	Oizumi	T. Kobayashi	·	2.5 km	MPC · JPL
107557	2001 DT_{81}	—	February 21, 2001	Kitt Peak	Spacewatch	·	2.3 km	MPC · JPL
107558	2001 DK_{85}	—	February 23, 2001	Cerro Tololo	Deep Lens Survey	·	2.3 km	MPC · JPL
107559	2001 DK_{86}	—	February 22, 2001	Nogales	Tenagra II	·	1.7 km	MPC · JPL
107560	2001 DM_{86}	—	February 22, 2001	Nogales	Tenagra II	·	2.0 km	MPC · JPL
107561 Quinn	2001 DW_{86}	Quinn	February 28, 2001	Badlands	Dyvig, R.	·	2.0 km	MPC · JPL
107562	2001 DV_{87}	—	February 16, 2001	Socorro	LINEAR	PAD	4.5 km	MPC · JPL
107563	2001 DZ_{87}	—	February 16, 2001	Socorro	LINEAR	·	2.1 km	MPC · JPL
107564	2001 DZ_{88}	—	February 27, 2001	Kitt Peak	Spacewatch	·	1.9 km	MPC · JPL
107565	2001 DG_{89}	—	February 27, 2001	Kitt Peak	Spacewatch	·	1.4 km	MPC · JPL
107566	2001 DH_{89}	—	February 27, 2001	Kitt Peak	Spacewatch	·	3.1 km	MPC · JPL
107567	2001 DK_{89}	—	February 27, 2001	Kleť	Kleť	·	1.5 km	MPC · JPL
107568	2001 DR_{89}	—	February 22, 2001	Socorro	LINEAR	·	6.6 km	MPC · JPL
107569	2001 DD_{90}	—	February 22, 2001	Socorro	LINEAR	·	1.9 km	MPC · JPL
107570	2001 DE_{90}	—	February 22, 2001	Socorro	LINEAR	·	7.3 km	MPC · JPL
107571	2001 DM_{90}	—	February 22, 2001	Socorro	LINEAR	·	5.7 km	MPC · JPL
107572	2001 DB_{91}	—	February 20, 2001	Socorro	LINEAR	·	1.9 km	MPC · JPL
107573	2001 DM_{92}	—	February 19, 2001	Anderson Mesa	LONEOS	·	1.6 km	MPC · JPL
107574	2001 DS_{92}	—	February 19, 2001	Anderson Mesa	LONEOS	·	1.8 km	MPC · JPL
107575	2001 DG_{94}	—	February 19, 2001	Socorro	LINEAR	·	1.7 km	MPC · JPL
107576	2001 DM_{94}	—	February 19, 2001	Socorro	LINEAR	·	2.4 km	MPC · JPL
107577	2001 DS_{95}	—	February 17, 2001	Socorro	LINEAR	·	2.3 km	MPC · JPL
107578	2001 DB_{96}	—	February 17, 2001	Socorro	LINEAR	fast	2.3 km	MPC · JPL
107579	2001 DF_{96}	—	February 17, 2001	Socorro	LINEAR	·	5.3 km	MPC · JPL
107580	2001 DN_{96}	—	February 17, 2001	Socorro	LINEAR	·	4.2 km	MPC · JPL
107581	2001 DA_{97}	—	February 17, 2001	Socorro	LINEAR	NYS	2.1 km	MPC · JPL
107582	2001 DP_{97}	—	February 17, 2001	Socorro	LINEAR	·	1.9 km	MPC · JPL
107583	2001 DZ_{97}	—	February 17, 2001	Socorro	LINEAR	·	1.8 km	MPC · JPL
107584	2001 DR_{98}	—	February 17, 2001	Socorro	LINEAR	·	2.9 km	MPC · JPL
107585	2001 DM_{99}	—	February 17, 2001	Socorro	LINEAR	·	2.6 km	MPC · JPL
107586	2001 DW_{100}	—	February 16, 2001	Socorro	LINEAR	·	3.2 km	MPC · JPL
107587	2001 DA_{101}	—	February 16, 2001	Kitt Peak	Spacewatch	V	1.3 km	MPC · JPL
107588	2001 DU_{101}	—	February 16, 2001	Socorro	LINEAR	·	3.4 km	MPC · JPL
107589	2001 DW_{101}	—	February 16, 2001	Socorro	LINEAR	·	1.9 km	MPC · JPL
107590	2001 DX_{101}	—	February 16, 2001	Socorro	LINEAR	·	2.8 km	MPC · JPL
107591	2001 DA_{102}	—	February 16, 2001	Socorro	LINEAR	·	2.0 km	MPC · JPL
107592	2001 DB_{102}	—	February 16, 2001	Socorro	LINEAR	·	3.2 km	MPC · JPL
107593	2001 DG_{102}	—	February 16, 2001	Socorro	LINEAR	·	4.3 km	MPC · JPL
107594	2001 DH_{102}	—	February 16, 2001	Socorro	LINEAR	·	2.5 km	MPC · JPL
107595	2001 DQ_{102}	—	February 16, 2001	Socorro	LINEAR	V	1.3 km	MPC · JPL
107596	2001 DA_{104}	—	February 16, 2001	Anderson Mesa	LONEOS	·	3.5 km	MPC · JPL
107597	2001 DL_{104}	—	February 16, 2001	Anderson Mesa	LONEOS	V	1.0 km	MPC · JPL
107598	2001 DW_{104}	—	February 16, 2001	Anderson Mesa	LONEOS	·	1.7 km	MPC · JPL
107599	2001 DC_{109}	—	February 19, 2001	Socorro	LINEAR	·	2.4 km	MPC · JPL
107600	2001 EO	—	March 2, 2001	Desert Beaver	W. K. Y. Yeung	·	2.5 km	MPC · JPL

== 107601–107700 ==
back to top

Designation			Discovery			Properties		Ref
Permanent	Provisional	Named after	Date	Site	Discoverer(s)	Category	Diam.	Ref
107601	2001 EW	—	March 2, 2001	Haleakala	NEAT	·	4.4 km	MPC · JPL
107602	2001 EN_{1}	—	March 1, 2001	Socorro	LINEAR	·	2.0 km	MPC · JPL
107603	2001 EN_{2}	—	March 1, 2001	Socorro	LINEAR	KON	4.5 km	MPC · JPL
107604	2001 ES_{2}	—	March 3, 2001	Socorro	LINEAR	(5)	1.9 km	MPC · JPL
107605	2001 ET_{2}	—	March 3, 2001	Socorro	LINEAR	·	2.1 km	MPC · JPL
107606	2001 EL_{3}	—	March 2, 2001	Anderson Mesa	LONEOS	·	1.3 km	MPC · JPL
107607	2001 ES_{3}	—	March 2, 2001	Anderson Mesa	LONEOS	·	2.7 km	MPC · JPL
107608	2001 EW_{3}	—	March 2, 2001	Anderson Mesa	LONEOS	MAS	1.3 km	MPC · JPL
107609	2001 EY_{3}	—	March 2, 2001	Anderson Mesa	LONEOS	·	3.5 km	MPC · JPL
107610	2001 EO_{4}	—	March 2, 2001	Anderson Mesa	LONEOS	NYS	1.8 km	MPC · JPL
107611	2001 EP_{4}	—	March 2, 2001	Anderson Mesa	LONEOS	·	2.1 km	MPC · JPL
107612	2001 EV_{4}	—	March 2, 2001	Anderson Mesa	LONEOS	NYS	1.9 km	MPC · JPL
107613	2001 EB_{5}	—	March 2, 2001	Anderson Mesa	LONEOS	·	1.0 km	MPC · JPL
107614	2001 ED_{5}	—	March 2, 2001	Anderson Mesa	LONEOS	NYS	2.1 km	MPC · JPL
107615	2001 EK_{5}	—	March 2, 2001	Anderson Mesa	LONEOS	slow	1.2 km	MPC · JPL
107616	2001 EO_{6}	—	March 2, 2001	Anderson Mesa	LONEOS	V	1.6 km	MPC · JPL
107617	2001 EW_{6}	—	March 2, 2001	Anderson Mesa	LONEOS	·	1.5 km	MPC · JPL
107618	2001 EO_{7}	—	March 2, 2001	Anderson Mesa	LONEOS	·	1.3 km	MPC · JPL
107619	2001 EQ_{7}	—	March 2, 2001	Anderson Mesa	LONEOS	NYS	2.1 km	MPC · JPL
107620	2001 EW_{7}	—	March 2, 2001	Anderson Mesa	LONEOS	NYS	2.1 km	MPC · JPL
107621	2001 EC_{8}	—	March 2, 2001	Anderson Mesa	LONEOS	NYS	2.5 km	MPC · JPL
107622	2001 EJ_{9}	—	March 2, 2001	Anderson Mesa	LONEOS	·	3.2 km	MPC · JPL
107623	2001 EM_{9}	—	March 2, 2001	Anderson Mesa	LONEOS	·	6.9 km	MPC · JPL
107624	2001 EN_{9}	—	March 2, 2001	Anderson Mesa	LONEOS	·	2.8 km	MPC · JPL
107625	2001 EX_{9}	—	March 2, 2001	Anderson Mesa	LONEOS	·	2.0 km	MPC · JPL
107626	2001 EG_{10}	—	March 2, 2001	Anderson Mesa	LONEOS	·	3.7 km	MPC · JPL
107627	2001 ER_{10}	—	March 2, 2001	Anderson Mesa	LONEOS	V	1.3 km	MPC · JPL
107628	2001 EV_{10}	—	March 2, 2001	Haleakala	NEAT	MAS	1.3 km	MPC · JPL
107629	2001 EY_{10}	—	March 2, 2001	Haleakala	NEAT	HNS	2.8 km	MPC · JPL
107630	2001 ET_{11}	—	March 3, 2001	Socorro	LINEAR	·	3.1 km	MPC · JPL
107631	2001 EU_{11}	—	March 3, 2001	Socorro	LINEAR	MAS	1.1 km	MPC · JPL
107632	2001 EX_{11}	—	March 3, 2001	Socorro	LINEAR	·	2.4 km	MPC · JPL
107633	2001 EA_{12}	—	March 3, 2001	Socorro	LINEAR	·	2.1 km	MPC · JPL
107634	2001 EG_{12}	—	March 3, 2001	Socorro	LINEAR	·	2.2 km	MPC · JPL
107635	2001 EL_{12}	—	March 3, 2001	Socorro	LINEAR	·	2.2 km	MPC · JPL
107636	2001 EL_{13}	—	March 15, 2001	Kitt Peak	Spacewatch	H	1.0 km	MPC · JPL
107637	2001 EO_{13}	—	March 15, 2001	Kitt Peak	Spacewatch	HNS	2.8 km	MPC · JPL
107638 Wendyfreedman	2001 EU_{13}	Wendyfreedman	March 15, 2001	Junk Bond	D. Healy	KON	4.3 km	MPC · JPL
107639	2001 EV_{13}	—	March 13, 2001	Socorro	LINEAR	·	2.5 km	MPC · JPL
107640	2001 EQ_{15}	—	March 14, 2001	Socorro	LINEAR	H	1.4 km	MPC · JPL
107641	2001 ER_{16}	—	March 15, 2001	Haleakala	NEAT	·	6.3 km	MPC · JPL
107642	2001 EZ_{16}	—	March 3, 2001	Socorro	LINEAR	H	1.2 km	MPC · JPL
107643	2001 EY_{17}	—	March 15, 2001	Oizumi	T. Kobayashi	EUN	2.9 km	MPC · JPL
107644	2001 EG_{18}	—	March 15, 2001	Kitt Peak	Spacewatch	·	2.0 km	MPC · JPL
107645	2001 EZ_{18}	—	March 14, 2001	Haleakala	NEAT	·	3.0 km	MPC · JPL
107646	2001 EG_{20}	—	March 15, 2001	Anderson Mesa	LONEOS	NYS ·	2.8 km	MPC · JPL
107647	2001 EQ_{20}	—	March 15, 2001	Anderson Mesa	LONEOS	·	2.5 km	MPC · JPL
107648	2001 ER_{20}	—	March 15, 2001	Anderson Mesa	LONEOS	(5)	2.2 km	MPC · JPL
107649	2001 ET_{20}	—	March 15, 2001	Anderson Mesa	LONEOS	·	2.2 km	MPC · JPL
107650	2001 ER_{21}	—	March 15, 2001	Anderson Mesa	LONEOS	PHO	4.6 km	MPC · JPL
107651	2001 EW_{21}	—	March 15, 2001	Anderson Mesa	LONEOS	·	2.0 km	MPC · JPL
107652	2001 EP_{23}	—	March 15, 2001	Haleakala	NEAT	·	1.9 km	MPC · JPL
107653	2001 EA_{24}	—	March 15, 2001	Kitt Peak	Spacewatch	·	4.5 km	MPC · JPL
107654	2001 EE_{24}	—	March 15, 2001	Haleakala	NEAT	·	2.2 km	MPC · JPL
107655	2001 EF_{24}	—	March 15, 2001	Haleakala	NEAT	·	2.4 km	MPC · JPL
107656	2001 EC_{25}	—	March 15, 2001	Kitt Peak	Spacewatch	NYS	2.4 km	MPC · JPL
107657	2001 EN_{25}	—	March 15, 2001	Socorro	LINEAR	·	3.6 km	MPC · JPL
107658	2001 EF_{27}	—	March 15, 2001	Anderson Mesa	LONEOS	·	2.7 km	MPC · JPL
107659	2001 EK_{27}	—	March 4, 2001	Socorro	LINEAR	URS	7.0 km	MPC · JPL
107660	2001 FH	—	March 16, 2001	Haleakala	NEAT	·	2.8 km	MPC · JPL
107661	2001 FC_{2}	—	March 16, 2001	Socorro	LINEAR	·	3.1 km	MPC · JPL
107662	2001 FG_{2}	—	March 17, 2001	Socorro	LINEAR	·	2.8 km	MPC · JPL
107663	2001 FK_{2}	—	March 18, 2001	Socorro	LINEAR	·	2.3 km	MPC · JPL
107664	2001 FO_{2}	—	March 18, 2001	Socorro	LINEAR	·	2.1 km	MPC · JPL
107665	2001 FK_{3}	—	March 18, 2001	Socorro	LINEAR	·	2.8 km	MPC · JPL
107666	2001 FN_{3}	—	March 18, 2001	Socorro	LINEAR	·	2.1 km	MPC · JPL
107667	2001 FW_{3}	—	March 18, 2001	Socorro	LINEAR	·	2.3 km	MPC · JPL
107668	2001 FY_{4}	—	March 18, 2001	Socorro	LINEAR	H	2.0 km	MPC · JPL
107669	2001 FC_{5}	—	March 18, 2001	Socorro	LINEAR	ERI	4.1 km	MPC · JPL
107670	2001 FE_{5}	—	March 18, 2001	Socorro	LINEAR	MAS	1.8 km	MPC · JPL
107671	2001 FW_{5}	—	March 18, 2001	Socorro	LINEAR	·	3.3 km	MPC · JPL
107672	2001 FE_{6}	—	March 19, 2001	Socorro	LINEAR	·	2.2 km	MPC · JPL
107673	2001 FV_{6}	—	March 19, 2001	Socorro	LINEAR	·	2.9 km	MPC · JPL
107674	2001 FU_{8}	—	March 19, 2001	Socorro	LINEAR	·	4.7 km	MPC · JPL
107675	2001 FA_{9}	—	March 20, 2001	Haleakala	NEAT	·	1.4 km	MPC · JPL
107676	2001 FD_{10}	—	March 17, 2001	Gnosca	S. Sposetti	MAS	1.4 km	MPC · JPL
107677	2001 FN_{10}	—	March 19, 2001	Anderson Mesa	LONEOS	V	1.5 km	MPC · JPL
107678	2001 FO_{10}	—	March 19, 2001	Anderson Mesa	LONEOS	·	2.0 km	MPC · JPL
107679	2001 FQ_{10}	—	March 19, 2001	Anderson Mesa	LONEOS	(29841) · fast	2.9 km	MPC · JPL
107680	2001 FS_{10}	—	March 19, 2001	Anderson Mesa	LONEOS	V	1.3 km	MPC · JPL
107681	2001 FO_{11}	—	March 19, 2001	Anderson Mesa	LONEOS	EOS	5.1 km	MPC · JPL
107682	2001 FB_{12}	—	March 19, 2001	Anderson Mesa	LONEOS	·	2.5 km	MPC · JPL
107683	2001 FD_{12}	—	March 19, 2001	Anderson Mesa	LONEOS	·	2.5 km	MPC · JPL
107684	2001 FF_{12}	—	March 19, 2001	Anderson Mesa	LONEOS	·	2.5 km	MPC · JPL
107685	2001 FJ_{12}	—	March 19, 2001	Anderson Mesa	LONEOS	NYS	2.3 km	MPC · JPL
107686	2001 FN_{12}	—	March 19, 2001	Anderson Mesa	LONEOS	HOF	5.4 km	MPC · JPL
107687	2001 FZ_{12}	—	March 19, 2001	Anderson Mesa	LONEOS	·	1.3 km	MPC · JPL
107688	2001 FB_{13}	—	March 19, 2001	Anderson Mesa	LONEOS	MAR	1.7 km	MPC · JPL
107689	2001 FE_{13}	—	March 19, 2001	Anderson Mesa	LONEOS	NYS	2.5 km	MPC · JPL
107690	2001 FB_{14}	—	March 19, 2001	Anderson Mesa	LONEOS	CYB	6.0 km	MPC · JPL
107691	2001 FE_{14}	—	March 19, 2001	Anderson Mesa	LONEOS	V	1.2 km	MPC · JPL
107692	2001 FA_{15}	—	March 19, 2001	Anderson Mesa	LONEOS	·	2.3 km	MPC · JPL
107693	2001 FE_{15}	—	March 19, 2001	Anderson Mesa	LONEOS	MAS	1.8 km	MPC · JPL
107694	2001 FO_{15}	—	March 19, 2001	Anderson Mesa	LONEOS	(1338) (FLO)	1.6 km	MPC · JPL
107695	2001 FP_{15}	—	March 19, 2001	Anderson Mesa	LONEOS	·	5.4 km	MPC · JPL
107696	2001 FZ_{15}	—	March 19, 2001	Anderson Mesa	LONEOS	·	1.6 km	MPC · JPL
107697	2001 FL_{16}	—	March 19, 2001	Anderson Mesa	LONEOS	·	2.7 km	MPC · JPL
107698	2001 FS_{16}	—	March 19, 2001	Anderson Mesa	LONEOS	·	5.9 km	MPC · JPL
107699	2001 FC_{17}	—	March 19, 2001	Anderson Mesa	LONEOS	·	1.7 km	MPC · JPL
107700	2001 FQ_{17}	—	March 19, 2001	Anderson Mesa	LONEOS	·	1.9 km	MPC · JPL

== 107701–107800 ==
back to top

Designation			Discovery			Properties		Ref
Permanent	Provisional	Named after	Date	Site	Discoverer(s)	Category	Diam.	Ref
107701	2001 FS_{17}	—	March 19, 2001	Anderson Mesa	LONEOS	EUN	2.7 km	MPC · JPL
107702	2001 FX_{17}	—	March 19, 2001	Anderson Mesa	LONEOS	NYS	2.4 km	MPC · JPL
107703	2001 FE_{18}	—	March 19, 2001	Anderson Mesa	LONEOS	·	2.8 km	MPC · JPL
107704	2001 FL_{18}	—	March 19, 2001	Anderson Mesa	LONEOS	·	2.1 km	MPC · JPL
107705	2001 FP_{18}	—	March 19, 2001	Anderson Mesa	LONEOS	NYS	2.4 km	MPC · JPL
107706	2001 FS_{18}	—	March 19, 2001	Anderson Mesa	LONEOS	·	3.0 km	MPC · JPL
107707	2001 FV_{18}	—	March 19, 2001	Anderson Mesa	LONEOS	EUN	2.3 km	MPC · JPL
107708	2001 FD_{19}	—	March 19, 2001	Anderson Mesa	LONEOS	MRX	2.0 km	MPC · JPL
107709	2001 FN_{19}	—	March 19, 2001	Anderson Mesa	LONEOS	V	1.3 km	MPC · JPL
107710	2001 FQ_{19}	—	March 19, 2001	Anderson Mesa	LONEOS	·	2.3 km	MPC · JPL
107711	2001 FC_{20}	—	March 19, 2001	Anderson Mesa	LONEOS	·	4.3 km	MPC · JPL
107712	2001 FF_{20}	—	March 19, 2001	Anderson Mesa	LONEOS	·	2.6 km	MPC · JPL
107713	2001 FS_{20}	—	March 19, 2001	Anderson Mesa	LONEOS	·	2.6 km	MPC · JPL
107714	2001 FZ_{21}	—	March 21, 2001	Anderson Mesa	LONEOS	·	2.5 km	MPC · JPL
107715	2001 FH_{22}	—	March 21, 2001	Anderson Mesa	LONEOS	·	2.5 km	MPC · JPL
107716	2001 FJ_{22}	—	March 21, 2001	Anderson Mesa	LONEOS	·	5.2 km	MPC · JPL
107717	2001 FV_{22}	—	March 21, 2001	Anderson Mesa	LONEOS	·	2.4 km	MPC · JPL
107718	2001 FF_{23}	—	March 21, 2001	Anderson Mesa	LONEOS	·	2.2 km	MPC · JPL
107719	2001 FP_{23}	—	March 21, 2001	Anderson Mesa	LONEOS	·	2.5 km	MPC · JPL
107720	2001 FR_{23}	—	March 21, 2001	Anderson Mesa	LONEOS	·	4.6 km	MPC · JPL
107721	2001 FT_{23}	—	March 21, 2001	Anderson Mesa	LONEOS	·	1.2 km	MPC · JPL
107722	2001 FJ_{24}	—	March 17, 2001	Socorro	LINEAR	·	2.1 km	MPC · JPL
107723	2001 FV_{24}	—	March 17, 2001	Socorro	LINEAR	·	2.9 km	MPC · JPL
107724	2001 FO_{25}	—	March 18, 2001	Socorro	LINEAR	·	4.3 km	MPC · JPL
107725	2001 FR_{25}	—	March 18, 2001	Socorro	LINEAR	·	7.7 km	MPC · JPL
107726	2001 FZ_{26}	—	March 18, 2001	Socorro	LINEAR	BRU	6.3 km	MPC · JPL
107727	2001 FF_{27}	—	March 18, 2001	Socorro	LINEAR	·	4.5 km	MPC · JPL
107728	2001 FG_{27}	—	March 18, 2001	Socorro	LINEAR	·	2.4 km	MPC · JPL
107729	2001 FT_{27}	—	March 18, 2001	Socorro	LINEAR	·	2.0 km	MPC · JPL
107730	2001 FC_{28}	—	March 19, 2001	Socorro	LINEAR	·	2.5 km	MPC · JPL
107731	2001 FH_{28}	—	March 19, 2001	Socorro	LINEAR	NYS	1.7 km	MPC · JPL
107732	2001 FK_{28}	—	March 19, 2001	Socorro	LINEAR	NYS	2.7 km	MPC · JPL
107733	2001 FO_{28}	—	March 19, 2001	Socorro	LINEAR	·	4.7 km	MPC · JPL
107734	2001 FO_{29}	—	March 18, 2001	Haleakala	NEAT	·	3.6 km	MPC · JPL
107735	2001 FA_{30}	—	March 20, 2001	Haleakala	NEAT	·	2.6 km	MPC · JPL
107736	2001 FY_{30}	—	March 21, 2001	Haleakala	NEAT	·	3.1 km	MPC · JPL
107737	2001 FA_{31}	—	March 21, 2001	Haleakala	NEAT	·	1.7 km	MPC · JPL
107738	2001 FC_{31}	—	March 21, 2001	Haleakala	NEAT	MAS	1.5 km	MPC · JPL
107739	2001 FT_{31}	—	March 22, 2001	Kitt Peak	Spacewatch	·	2.1 km	MPC · JPL
107740	2001 FN_{32}	—	March 22, 2001	Kitt Peak	Spacewatch	·	2.9 km	MPC · JPL
107741	2001 FS_{32}	—	March 18, 2001	Socorro	LINEAR	H	970 m	MPC · JPL
107742	2001 FH_{33}	—	March 17, 2001	Socorro	LINEAR	·	3.4 km	MPC · JPL
107743	2001 FN_{33}	—	March 18, 2001	Socorro	LINEAR	·	2.3 km	MPC · JPL
107744	2001 FS_{33}	—	March 18, 2001	Socorro	LINEAR	·	2.3 km	MPC · JPL
107745	2001 FA_{35}	—	March 18, 2001	Socorro	LINEAR	·	1.4 km	MPC · JPL
107746	2001 FE_{35}	—	March 18, 2001	Socorro	LINEAR	·	2.2 km	MPC · JPL
107747	2001 FO_{35}	—	March 18, 2001	Socorro	LINEAR	·	2.2 km	MPC · JPL
107748	2001 FQ_{35}	—	March 18, 2001	Socorro	LINEAR	·	2.5 km	MPC · JPL
107749	2001 FS_{35}	—	March 18, 2001	Socorro	LINEAR	·	2.1 km	MPC · JPL
107750	2001 FY_{35}	—	March 18, 2001	Socorro	LINEAR	·	2.4 km	MPC · JPL
107751	2001 FH_{36}	—	March 18, 2001	Socorro	LINEAR	NYS	2.1 km	MPC · JPL
107752	2001 FS_{36}	—	March 18, 2001	Socorro	LINEAR	·	1.7 km	MPC · JPL
107753	2001 FW_{36}	—	March 18, 2001	Socorro	LINEAR	·	2.0 km	MPC · JPL
107754	2001 FZ_{36}	—	March 18, 2001	Socorro	LINEAR	WIT	2.0 km	MPC · JPL
107755	2001 FA_{37}	—	March 18, 2001	Socorro	LINEAR	MAS	1.2 km	MPC · JPL
107756	2001 FE_{37}	—	March 18, 2001	Socorro	LINEAR	·	1.7 km	MPC · JPL
107757	2001 FK_{37}	—	March 18, 2001	Socorro	LINEAR	·	2.3 km	MPC · JPL
107758	2001 FM_{37}	—	March 18, 2001	Socorro	LINEAR	EUN	2.3 km	MPC · JPL
107759	2001 FF_{38}	—	March 18, 2001	Socorro	LINEAR	PHO	1.7 km	MPC · JPL
107760	2001 FG_{38}	—	March 18, 2001	Socorro	LINEAR	EUN	1.9 km	MPC · JPL
107761	2001 FS_{38}	—	March 18, 2001	Socorro	LINEAR	·	2.3 km	MPC · JPL
107762	2001 FY_{39}	—	March 18, 2001	Socorro	LINEAR	·	3.5 km	MPC · JPL
107763	2001 FK_{40}	—	March 18, 2001	Socorro	LINEAR	·	3.4 km	MPC · JPL
107764	2001 FN_{40}	—	March 18, 2001	Socorro	LINEAR	·	3.6 km	MPC · JPL
107765	2001 FP_{40}	—	March 18, 2001	Socorro	LINEAR	·	2.9 km	MPC · JPL
107766	2001 FS_{40}	—	March 18, 2001	Socorro	LINEAR	·	1.4 km	MPC · JPL
107767	2001 FW_{40}	—	March 18, 2001	Socorro	LINEAR	GEF	2.6 km	MPC · JPL
107768	2001 FN_{41}	—	March 18, 2001	Socorro	LINEAR	·	2.5 km	MPC · JPL
107769	2001 FW_{41}	—	March 18, 2001	Socorro	LINEAR	MAS	1.5 km	MPC · JPL
107770	2001 FY_{41}	—	March 18, 2001	Socorro	LINEAR	MAS	1.6 km	MPC · JPL
107771	2001 FA_{42}	—	March 18, 2001	Socorro	LINEAR	DOR	4.5 km	MPC · JPL
107772	2001 FW_{43}	—	March 18, 2001	Socorro	LINEAR	·	2.3 km	MPC · JPL
107773	2001 FL_{44}	—	March 18, 2001	Socorro	LINEAR	·	2.8 km	MPC · JPL
107774	2001 FJ_{46}	—	March 18, 2001	Socorro	LINEAR	·	1.3 km	MPC · JPL
107775	2001 FH_{47}	—	March 18, 2001	Socorro	LINEAR	·	2.8 km	MPC · JPL
107776	2001 FN_{47}	—	March 18, 2001	Socorro	LINEAR	·	3.9 km	MPC · JPL
107777	2001 FO_{47}	—	March 18, 2001	Socorro	LINEAR	ADE	5.7 km	MPC · JPL
107778	2001 FD_{48}	—	March 18, 2001	Socorro	LINEAR	(194)	3.4 km	MPC · JPL
107779	2001 FG_{48}	—	March 18, 2001	Socorro	LINEAR	·	1.2 km	MPC · JPL
107780	2001 FW_{48}	—	March 18, 2001	Socorro	LINEAR	·	3.6 km	MPC · JPL
107781	2001 FO_{49}	—	March 18, 2001	Socorro	LINEAR	AGN	2.2 km	MPC · JPL
107782	2001 FX_{49}	—	March 18, 2001	Socorro	LINEAR	EUN	2.4 km	MPC · JPL
107783	2001 FR_{50}	—	March 18, 2001	Socorro	LINEAR	·	1.9 km	MPC · JPL
107784	2001 FA_{51}	—	March 18, 2001	Socorro	LINEAR	JUN	2.5 km	MPC · JPL
107785	2001 FN_{51}	—	March 18, 2001	Socorro	LINEAR	·	2.8 km	MPC · JPL
107786	2001 FV_{51}	—	March 18, 2001	Socorro	LINEAR	·	6.9 km	MPC · JPL
107787	2001 FE_{52}	—	March 18, 2001	Socorro	LINEAR	·	2.3 km	MPC · JPL
107788	2001 FG_{52}	—	March 18, 2001	Socorro	LINEAR	RAF	2.0 km	MPC · JPL
107789	2001 FM_{52}	—	March 18, 2001	Socorro	LINEAR	·	1.7 km	MPC · JPL
107790	2001 FR_{52}	—	March 18, 2001	Socorro	LINEAR	·	1.3 km	MPC · JPL
107791	2001 FU_{52}	—	March 18, 2001	Socorro	LINEAR	·	2.1 km	MPC · JPL
107792	2001 FN_{53}	—	March 18, 2001	Socorro	LINEAR	·	4.2 km	MPC · JPL
107793	2001 FG_{54}	—	March 18, 2001	Socorro	LINEAR	·	4.3 km	MPC · JPL
107794	2001 FK_{54}	—	March 18, 2001	Socorro	LINEAR	PHO	1.8 km	MPC · JPL
107795	2001 FN_{54}	—	March 18, 2001	Socorro	LINEAR	·	4.7 km	MPC · JPL
107796	2001 FQ_{54}	—	March 18, 2001	Socorro	LINEAR	·	2.3 km	MPC · JPL
107797	2001 FF_{55}	—	March 21, 2001	Socorro	LINEAR	·	4.6 km	MPC · JPL
107798	2001 FJ_{56}	—	March 23, 2001	Socorro	LINEAR	BAP	1.8 km	MPC · JPL
107799	2001 FK_{56}	—	March 23, 2001	Socorro	LINEAR	·	2.5 km	MPC · JPL
107800	2001 FA_{57}	—	March 23, 2001	Anderson Mesa	LONEOS	·	3.2 km	MPC · JPL

== 107801–107900 ==
back to top

Designation			Discovery			Properties		Ref
Permanent	Provisional	Named after	Date	Site	Discoverer(s)	Category	Diam.	Ref
107801	2001 FF_{58}	—	March 18, 2001	Socorro	LINEAR	·	1.7 km	MPC · JPL
107802	2001 FT_{58}	—	March 24, 2001	Haleakala	NEAT	PHO	3.2 km	MPC · JPL
107803	2001 FU_{58}	—	March 26, 2001	Cordell-Lorenz	D. T. Durig	·	1.8 km	MPC · JPL
107804	2001 FV_{58}	—	March 26, 2001	Kitt Peak	Spacewatch	L4	18 km	MPC · JPL
107805 Saibi	2001 FY_{58}	Saibi	March 21, 2001	Kuma Kogen	A. Nakamura	·	1.9 km	MPC · JPL
107806	2001 FZ_{58}	—	March 26, 2001	Kanab	Sheridan, E. E.	·	2.0 km	MPC · JPL
107807	2001 FG_{59}	—	March 19, 2001	Socorro	LINEAR	·	1.7 km	MPC · JPL
107808	2001 FH_{59}	—	March 19, 2001	Socorro	LINEAR	·	1.9 km	MPC · JPL
107809	2001 FL_{59}	—	March 19, 2001	Socorro	LINEAR	NYS	2.0 km	MPC · JPL
107810	2001 FN_{59}	—	March 19, 2001	Socorro	LINEAR	·	1.6 km	MPC · JPL
107811	2001 FO_{59}	—	March 19, 2001	Socorro	LINEAR	V	1.1 km	MPC · JPL
107812	2001 FR_{59}	—	March 19, 2001	Socorro	LINEAR	·	7.3 km	MPC · JPL
107813	2001 FS_{59}	—	March 19, 2001	Socorro	LINEAR	·	2.4 km	MPC · JPL
107814	2001 FQ_{60}	—	March 19, 2001	Socorro	LINEAR	·	2.1 km	MPC · JPL
107815	2001 FR_{60}	—	March 19, 2001	Socorro	LINEAR	·	2.5 km	MPC · JPL
107816	2001 FW_{60}	—	March 19, 2001	Socorro	LINEAR	·	2.4 km	MPC · JPL
107817	2001 FO_{61}	—	March 19, 2001	Socorro	LINEAR	PHO	2.2 km	MPC · JPL
107818	2001 FX_{61}	—	March 19, 2001	Socorro	LINEAR	·	5.1 km	MPC · JPL
107819	2001 FM_{62}	—	March 19, 2001	Socorro	LINEAR	·	1.8 km	MPC · JPL
107820	2001 FX_{62}	—	March 19, 2001	Socorro	LINEAR	V	1.2 km	MPC · JPL
107821	2001 FK_{63}	—	March 19, 2001	Socorro	LINEAR	MAS	1.2 km	MPC · JPL
107822	2001 FS_{63}	—	March 19, 2001	Socorro	LINEAR	MAS	1.3 km	MPC · JPL
107823	2001 FA_{64}	—	March 19, 2001	Socorro	LINEAR	·	4.8 km	MPC · JPL
107824	2001 FB_{64}	—	March 19, 2001	Socorro	LINEAR	·	1.8 km	MPC · JPL
107825	2001 FN_{64}	—	March 19, 2001	Socorro	LINEAR	·	5.1 km	MPC · JPL
107826	2001 FM_{65}	—	March 19, 2001	Socorro	LINEAR	·	2.7 km	MPC · JPL
107827	2001 FS_{65}	—	March 19, 2001	Socorro	LINEAR	NYS	2.1 km	MPC · JPL
107828	2001 FS_{67}	—	March 19, 2001	Socorro	LINEAR	·	1.4 km	MPC · JPL
107829	2001 FZ_{67}	—	March 19, 2001	Socorro	LINEAR	·	2.0 km	MPC · JPL
107830	2001 FY_{69}	—	March 19, 2001	Socorro	LINEAR	·	3.0 km	MPC · JPL
107831	2001 FB_{70}	—	March 19, 2001	Socorro	LINEAR	·	3.9 km	MPC · JPL
107832	2001 FE_{70}	—	March 19, 2001	Socorro	LINEAR	EUN	2.4 km	MPC · JPL
107833	2001 FN_{70}	—	March 19, 2001	Socorro	LINEAR	MAS	1.5 km	MPC · JPL
107834	2001 FT_{70}	—	March 19, 2001	Socorro	LINEAR	EUN	2.1 km	MPC · JPL
107835	2001 FQ_{71}	—	March 19, 2001	Socorro	LINEAR	·	2.1 km	MPC · JPL
107836	2001 FC_{72}	—	March 19, 2001	Socorro	LINEAR	·	2.9 km	MPC · JPL
107837	2001 FD_{72}	—	March 19, 2001	Socorro	LINEAR	·	1.2 km	MPC · JPL
107838	2001 FJ_{72}	—	March 19, 2001	Socorro	LINEAR	·	2.5 km	MPC · JPL
107839	2001 FL_{72}	—	March 19, 2001	Socorro	LINEAR	ERI	2.4 km	MPC · JPL
107840	2001 FA_{73}	—	March 19, 2001	Socorro	LINEAR	·	2.3 km	MPC · JPL
107841	2001 FF_{73}	—	March 19, 2001	Socorro	LINEAR	·	1.3 km	MPC · JPL
107842	2001 FQ_{73}	—	March 19, 2001	Socorro	LINEAR	·	1.5 km	MPC · JPL
107843	2001 FA_{74}	—	March 19, 2001	Socorro	LINEAR	·	4.4 km	MPC · JPL
107844	2001 FE_{74}	—	March 19, 2001	Socorro	LINEAR	·	6.7 km	MPC · JPL
107845	2001 FL_{75}	—	March 19, 2001	Socorro	LINEAR	NYS	2.0 km	MPC · JPL
107846	2001 FR_{75}	—	March 19, 2001	Socorro	LINEAR	·	2.1 km	MPC · JPL
107847	2001 FU_{75}	—	March 19, 2001	Socorro	LINEAR	·	2.0 km	MPC · JPL
107848	2001 FE_{76}	—	March 19, 2001	Socorro	LINEAR	ADE	4.1 km	MPC · JPL
107849	2001 FV_{76}	—	March 19, 2001	Socorro	LINEAR	·	2.4 km	MPC · JPL
107850	2001 FA_{77}	—	March 19, 2001	Socorro	LINEAR	·	2.0 km	MPC · JPL
107851	2001 FF_{77}	—	March 19, 2001	Socorro	LINEAR	·	3.3 km	MPC · JPL
107852	2001 FP_{77}	—	March 19, 2001	Socorro	LINEAR	·	2.7 km	MPC · JPL
107853	2001 FT_{77}	—	March 19, 2001	Socorro	LINEAR	·	2.7 km	MPC · JPL
107854	2001 FV_{77}	—	March 19, 2001	Socorro	LINEAR	MAR	3.0 km	MPC · JPL
107855	2001 FU_{78}	—	March 19, 2001	Socorro	LINEAR	slow	1.8 km	MPC · JPL
107856	2001 FW_{78}	—	March 19, 2001	Socorro	LINEAR	·	1.6 km	MPC · JPL
107857	2001 FY_{78}	—	March 19, 2001	Socorro	LINEAR	·	2.1 km	MPC · JPL
107858	2001 FB_{79}	—	March 19, 2001	Socorro	LINEAR	·	3.5 km	MPC · JPL
107859	2001 FC_{79}	—	March 19, 2001	Socorro	LINEAR	·	3.1 km	MPC · JPL
107860	2001 FH_{80}	—	March 21, 2001	Socorro	LINEAR	·	3.0 km	MPC · JPL
107861	2001 FN_{80}	—	March 21, 2001	Socorro	LINEAR	LIX	9.6 km	MPC · JPL
107862	2001 FP_{80}	—	March 21, 2001	Socorro	LINEAR	EUP	7.1 km	MPC · JPL
107863	2001 FQ_{80}	—	March 21, 2001	Socorro	LINEAR	JUN	2.8 km	MPC · JPL
107864	2001 FT_{80}	—	March 21, 2001	Socorro	LINEAR	·	2.8 km	MPC · JPL
107865	2001 FO_{82}	—	March 23, 2001	Socorro	LINEAR	·	3.8 km	MPC · JPL
107866	2001 FE_{84}	—	March 26, 2001	Kitt Peak	Spacewatch	·	1.8 km	MPC · JPL
107867	2001 FH_{85}	—	March 26, 2001	Kitt Peak	Spacewatch	·	3.7 km	MPC · JPL
107868	2001 FT_{85}	—	March 26, 2001	Cerro Tololo	Deep Lens Survey	NYS	2.2 km	MPC · JPL
107869	2001 FM_{86}	—	March 27, 2001	Desert Beaver	W. K. Y. Yeung	·	1.5 km	MPC · JPL
107870	2001 FY_{86}	—	March 21, 2001	Anderson Mesa	LONEOS	·	1.9 km	MPC · JPL
107871	2001 FB_{87}	—	March 21, 2001	Anderson Mesa	LONEOS	·	2.2 km	MPC · JPL
107872	2001 FL_{87}	—	March 21, 2001	Anderson Mesa	LONEOS	·	1.3 km	MPC · JPL
107873	2001 FV_{87}	—	March 21, 2001	Anderson Mesa	LONEOS	·	2.2 km	MPC · JPL
107874	2001 FD_{88}	—	March 21, 2001	Anderson Mesa	LONEOS	·	6.6 km	MPC · JPL
107875	2001 FF_{88}	—	March 27, 2001	Anderson Mesa	LONEOS	·	6.8 km	MPC · JPL
107876	2001 FV_{88}	—	March 26, 2001	Kitt Peak	Spacewatch	·	2.2 km	MPC · JPL
107877	2001 FZ_{88}	—	March 27, 2001	Kitt Peak	Spacewatch	NYS	2.3 km	MPC · JPL
107878	2001 FG_{89}	—	March 27, 2001	Kitt Peak	Spacewatch	·	2.5 km	MPC · JPL
107879	2001 FP_{89}	—	March 27, 2001	Kitt Peak	Spacewatch	THM	5.2 km	MPC · JPL
107880	2001 FT_{89}	—	March 27, 2001	Kitt Peak	Spacewatch	·	1.9 km	MPC · JPL
107881	2001 FS_{90}	—	March 26, 2001	Socorro	LINEAR	NYS	3.1 km	MPC · JPL
107882	2001 FA_{91}	—	March 26, 2001	Socorro	LINEAR	·	3.3 km	MPC · JPL
107883	2001 FJ_{91}	—	March 27, 2001	Haleakala	NEAT	·	2.2 km	MPC · JPL
107884	2001 FK_{91}	—	March 27, 2001	Haleakala	NEAT	·	2.2 km	MPC · JPL
107885	2001 FY_{91}	—	March 16, 2001	Socorro	LINEAR	NEM	3.5 km	MPC · JPL
107886	2001 FC_{92}	—	March 16, 2001	Socorro	LINEAR	·	5.2 km	MPC · JPL
107887	2001 FL_{92}	—	March 16, 2001	Socorro	LINEAR	·	4.2 km	MPC · JPL
107888	2001 FY_{92}	—	March 16, 2001	Socorro	LINEAR	·	2.1 km	MPC · JPL
107889	2001 FA_{93}	—	March 16, 2001	Socorro	LINEAR	·	2.5 km	MPC · JPL
107890	2001 FC_{93}	—	March 16, 2001	Socorro	LINEAR	·	2.3 km	MPC · JPL
107891	2001 FO_{93}	—	March 16, 2001	Socorro	LINEAR	·	2.1 km	MPC · JPL
107892	2001 FS_{93}	—	March 16, 2001	Socorro	LINEAR	·	1.7 km	MPC · JPL
107893	2001 FU_{93}	—	March 16, 2001	Socorro	LINEAR	EOS	4.4 km	MPC · JPL
107894	2001 FG_{94}	—	March 16, 2001	Socorro	LINEAR	·	3.4 km	MPC · JPL
107895	2001 FR_{94}	—	March 16, 2001	Socorro	LINEAR	·	2.9 km	MPC · JPL
107896	2001 FT_{94}	—	March 16, 2001	Socorro	LINEAR	·	2.4 km	MPC · JPL
107897	2001 FC_{95}	—	March 16, 2001	Socorro	LINEAR	·	2.4 km	MPC · JPL
107898	2001 FL_{95}	—	March 16, 2001	Socorro	LINEAR	·	3.7 km	MPC · JPL
107899	2001 FR_{95}	—	March 16, 2001	Socorro	LINEAR	·	1.8 km	MPC · JPL
107900	2001 FT_{95}	—	March 16, 2001	Socorro	LINEAR	·	4.5 km	MPC · JPL

== 107901–108000 ==
back to top

Designation			Discovery			Properties		Ref
Permanent	Provisional	Named after	Date	Site	Discoverer(s)	Category	Diam.	Ref
107901	2001 FY_{95}	—	March 16, 2001	Socorro	LINEAR	·	2.9 km	MPC · JPL
107902	2001 FB_{96}	—	March 16, 2001	Socorro	LINEAR	·	1.9 km	MPC · JPL
107903	2001 FV_{96}	—	March 16, 2001	Socorro	LINEAR	MAR	2.4 km	MPC · JPL
107904	2001 FJ_{97}	—	March 16, 2001	Socorro	LINEAR	·	1.5 km	MPC · JPL
107905	2001 FU_{97}	—	March 16, 2001	Socorro	LINEAR	·	4.6 km	MPC · JPL
107906	2001 FY_{97}	—	March 16, 2001	Socorro	LINEAR	MAR	3.5 km	MPC · JPL
107907	2001 FZ_{97}	—	March 16, 2001	Socorro	LINEAR	·	3.2 km	MPC · JPL
107908	2001 FH_{99}	—	March 16, 2001	Socorro	LINEAR	·	2.4 km	MPC · JPL
107909	2001 FM_{99}	—	March 16, 2001	Socorro	LINEAR	·	1.9 km	MPC · JPL
107910	2001 FT_{99}	—	March 16, 2001	Socorro	LINEAR	·	5.5 km	MPC · JPL
107911	2001 FC_{100}	—	March 16, 2001	Haleakala	NEAT	·	2.6 km	MPC · JPL
107912	2001 FD_{100}	—	March 16, 2001	Kitt Peak	Spacewatch	·	2.1 km	MPC · JPL
107913	2001 FH_{100}	—	March 17, 2001	Socorro	LINEAR	·	2.2 km	MPC · JPL
107914	2001 FU_{100}	—	March 17, 2001	Kitt Peak	Spacewatch	EUN	1.8 km	MPC · JPL
107915	2001 FZ_{100}	—	March 17, 2001	Socorro	LINEAR	·	3.9 km	MPC · JPL
107916	2001 FA_{101}	—	March 17, 2001	Socorro	LINEAR	MAR	1.9 km	MPC · JPL
107917	2001 FE_{101}	—	March 17, 2001	Socorro	LINEAR	·	2.9 km	MPC · JPL
107918	2001 FM_{101}	—	March 17, 2001	Socorro	LINEAR	·	3.8 km	MPC · JPL
107919	2001 FJ_{102}	—	March 17, 2001	Socorro	LINEAR	·	6.0 km	MPC · JPL
107920	2001 FW_{102}	—	March 18, 2001	Socorro	LINEAR	·	2.4 km	MPC · JPL
107921	2001 FZ_{102}	—	March 18, 2001	Socorro	LINEAR	·	1.7 km	MPC · JPL
107922	2001 FB_{103}	—	March 18, 2001	Socorro	LINEAR	·	3.2 km	MPC · JPL
107923	2001 FN_{103}	—	March 18, 2001	Socorro	LINEAR	·	2.6 km	MPC · JPL
107924	2001 FO_{103}	—	March 18, 2001	Socorro	LINEAR	NYS	2.3 km	MPC · JPL
107925	2001 FQ_{103}	—	March 18, 2001	Socorro	LINEAR	·	2.2 km	MPC · JPL
107926	2001 FT_{103}	—	March 18, 2001	Socorro	LINEAR	·	1.4 km	MPC · JPL
107927	2001 FE_{104}	—	March 18, 2001	Socorro	LINEAR	·	2.3 km	MPC · JPL
107928	2001 FM_{105}	—	March 18, 2001	Socorro	LINEAR	·	2.2 km	MPC · JPL
107929	2001 FV_{106}	—	March 18, 2001	Anderson Mesa	LONEOS	·	1.3 km	MPC · JPL
107930	2001 FU_{108}	—	March 18, 2001	Socorro	LINEAR	MAS	920 m	MPC · JPL
107931	2001 FV_{108}	—	March 18, 2001	Socorro	LINEAR	·	2.5 km	MPC · JPL
107932	2001 FZ_{108}	—	March 18, 2001	Socorro	LINEAR	NEM	4.1 km	MPC · JPL
107933	2001 FB_{110}	—	March 18, 2001	Socorro	LINEAR	·	5.6 km	MPC · JPL
107934	2001 FK_{110}	—	March 18, 2001	Socorro	LINEAR	·	1.7 km	MPC · JPL
107935	2001 FV_{111}	—	March 18, 2001	Socorro	LINEAR	·	4.9 km	MPC · JPL
107936	2001 FA_{113}	—	March 18, 2001	Kitt Peak	Spacewatch	·	2.7 km	MPC · JPL
107937	2001 FN_{113}	—	March 19, 2001	Socorro	LINEAR	·	2.4 km	MPC · JPL
107938	2001 FQ_{113}	—	March 19, 2001	Anderson Mesa	LONEOS	·	1.9 km	MPC · JPL
107939	2001 FV_{113}	—	March 19, 2001	Anderson Mesa	LONEOS	NYS	2.3 km	MPC · JPL
107940	2001 FE_{114}	—	March 19, 2001	Anderson Mesa	LONEOS	·	2.1 km	MPC · JPL
107941	2001 FY_{114}	—	March 19, 2001	Anderson Mesa	LONEOS	·	2.3 km	MPC · JPL
107942	2001 FB_{115}	—	March 19, 2001	Anderson Mesa	LONEOS	HOF	5.7 km	MPC · JPL
107943	2001 FO_{115}	—	March 19, 2001	Socorro	LINEAR	·	2.6 km	MPC · JPL
107944	2001 FU_{115}	—	March 19, 2001	Anderson Mesa	LONEOS	·	2.2 km	MPC · JPL
107945	2001 FX_{117}	—	March 19, 2001	Kitt Peak	Spacewatch	·	2.0 km	MPC · JPL
107946	2001 FY_{117}	—	March 19, 2001	Kitt Peak	Spacewatch	ADE	5.3 km	MPC · JPL
107947	2001 FA_{118}	—	March 19, 2001	Socorro	LINEAR	·	1.4 km	MPC · JPL
107948	2001 FC_{118}	—	March 19, 2001	Socorro	LINEAR	(6769)	2.3 km	MPC · JPL
107949	2001 FJ_{118}	—	March 20, 2001	Haleakala	NEAT	·	2.0 km	MPC · JPL
107950	2001 FA_{120}	—	March 28, 2001	Kitt Peak	Spacewatch	KOR	1.7 km	MPC · JPL
107951	2001 FP_{120}	—	March 26, 2001	Socorro	LINEAR	·	4.0 km	MPC · JPL
107952	2001 FS_{120}	—	March 26, 2001	Socorro	LINEAR	·	2.2 km	MPC · JPL
107953	2001 FV_{120}	—	March 26, 2001	Socorro	LINEAR	EUN	2.4 km	MPC · JPL
107954	2001 FX_{120}	—	March 26, 2001	Socorro	LINEAR	·	2.0 km	MPC · JPL
107955	2001 FY_{120}	—	March 26, 2001	Socorro	LINEAR	·	3.2 km	MPC · JPL
107956	2001 FF_{122}	—	March 23, 2001	Anderson Mesa	LONEOS	·	2.5 km	MPC · JPL
107957	2001 FL_{122}	—	March 23, 2001	Anderson Mesa	LONEOS	·	2.5 km	MPC · JPL
107958	2001 FM_{122}	—	March 23, 2001	Anderson Mesa	LONEOS	AGN	2.4 km	MPC · JPL
107959	2001 FT_{122}	—	March 23, 2001	Anderson Mesa	LONEOS	·	2.0 km	MPC · JPL
107960	2001 FV_{122}	—	March 23, 2001	Anderson Mesa	LONEOS	NYS	2.1 km	MPC · JPL
107961	2001 FZ_{122}	—	March 23, 2001	Anderson Mesa	LONEOS	·	4.2 km	MPC · JPL
107962	2001 FK_{123}	—	March 23, 2001	Anderson Mesa	LONEOS	·	3.8 km	MPC · JPL
107963	2001 FT_{123}	—	March 23, 2001	Anderson Mesa	LONEOS	·	3.3 km	MPC · JPL
107964	2001 FR_{124}	—	March 29, 2001	Anderson Mesa	LONEOS	·	2.2 km	MPC · JPL
107965	2001 FT_{124}	—	March 29, 2001	Anderson Mesa	LONEOS	·	1.7 km	MPC · JPL
107966	2001 FX_{124}	—	March 29, 2001	Anderson Mesa	LONEOS	EUN	1.9 km	MPC · JPL
107967	2001 FF_{125}	—	March 29, 2001	Anderson Mesa	LONEOS	LEO	3.5 km	MPC · JPL
107968	2001 FK_{125}	—	March 24, 2001	Kitt Peak	Spacewatch	·	3.1 km	MPC · JPL
107969	2001 FM_{125}	—	March 24, 2001	Kitt Peak	Spacewatch	(11882)	2.8 km	MPC · JPL
107970	2001 FS_{126}	—	March 26, 2001	Socorro	LINEAR	HNS	2.6 km	MPC · JPL
107971	2001 FG_{127}	—	March 29, 2001	Socorro	LINEAR	·	3.1 km	MPC · JPL
107972	2001 FM_{127}	—	March 24, 2001	Haleakala	NEAT	·	5.0 km	MPC · JPL
107973	2001 FS_{128}	—	March 29, 2001	Socorro	LINEAR	·	5.5 km	MPC · JPL
107974	2001 FY_{128}	—	March 26, 2001	Socorro	LINEAR	·	2.5 km	MPC · JPL
107975	2001 FD_{129}	—	March 26, 2001	Socorro	LINEAR	·	2.8 km	MPC · JPL
107976	2001 FT_{129}	—	March 29, 2001	Socorro	LINEAR	·	2.4 km	MPC · JPL
107977	2001 FZ_{129}	—	March 29, 2001	Socorro	LINEAR	·	2.0 km	MPC · JPL
107978	2001 FE_{130}	—	March 29, 2001	Socorro	LINEAR	·	6.2 km	MPC · JPL
107979	2001 FR_{130}	—	March 31, 2001	Desert Beaver	W. K. Y. Yeung	·	2.2 km	MPC · JPL
107980	2001 FS_{130}	—	March 20, 2001	Haleakala	NEAT	·	1.8 km	MPC · JPL
107981	2001 FY_{130}	—	March 20, 2001	Haleakala	NEAT	·	3.7 km	MPC · JPL
107982	2001 FG_{131}	—	March 20, 2001	Haleakala	NEAT	·	6.4 km	MPC · JPL
107983	2001 FG_{132}	—	March 20, 2001	Kitt Peak	Spacewatch	·	2.5 km	MPC · JPL
107984	2001 FT_{132}	—	March 20, 2001	Haleakala	NEAT	·	1.3 km	MPC · JPL
107985	2001 FP_{133}	—	March 20, 2001	Haleakala	NEAT	JUN	1.5 km	MPC · JPL
107986	2001 FR_{133}	—	March 20, 2001	Haleakala	NEAT	·	1.4 km	MPC · JPL
107987	2001 FG_{134}	—	March 20, 2001	Haleakala	NEAT	·	2.1 km	MPC · JPL
107988	2001 FJ_{134}	—	March 20, 2001	Haleakala	NEAT	·	2.1 km	MPC · JPL
107989	2001 FF_{135}	—	March 21, 2001	Anderson Mesa	LONEOS	·	1.7 km	MPC · JPL
107990	2001 FJ_{135}	—	March 21, 2001	Socorro	LINEAR	H	1.3 km	MPC · JPL
107991	2001 FK_{136}	—	March 21, 2001	Anderson Mesa	LONEOS	·	2.2 km	MPC · JPL
107992	2001 FM_{136}	—	March 21, 2001	Anderson Mesa	LONEOS	·	5.2 km	MPC · JPL
107993	2001 FQ_{136}	—	March 21, 2001	Anderson Mesa	LONEOS	·	2.7 km	MPC · JPL
107994	2001 FZ_{136}	—	March 21, 2001	Anderson Mesa	LONEOS	EUN	2.3 km	MPC · JPL
107995	2001 FB_{137}	—	March 21, 2001	Haleakala	NEAT	·	1.5 km	MPC · JPL
107996	2001 FD_{137}	—	March 21, 2001	Anderson Mesa	LONEOS	·	4.4 km	MPC · JPL
107997	2001 FF_{137}	—	March 21, 2001	Anderson Mesa	LONEOS	·	3.7 km	MPC · JPL
107998	2001 FM_{137}	—	March 21, 2001	Haleakala	NEAT	·	2.1 km	MPC · JPL
107999	2001 FS_{137}	—	March 21, 2001	Anderson Mesa	LONEOS	·	2.7 km	MPC · JPL
108000	2001 FW_{137}	—	March 21, 2001	Anderson Mesa	LONEOS	·	2.9 km	MPC · JPL

back to top

== See also ==
- Meanings of minor-planet names: 107001–108000
