= List of minor planets: 108001–109000 =

The following is a partial list of minor planets, running from minor-planet number 108001 through 109000, inclusive. The primary data for this and other partial lists is based on JPL's "Small-Body Orbital Elements" and data available from the Minor Planet Center. Critical list information is also provided by the MPC, unless otherwise specified from Lowell Observatory. A detailed description of the table's columns and additional sources are given on the main page including a complete list of every page in this series, and a statistical break-up on the dynamical classification of minor planets.

Also see the summary list of all named bodies in numerical and alphabetical order, and the corresponding naming citations for the number range of this particular list. New namings may only be added to this list after official publication, as the preannouncement of names is condemned by the Working Group for Small Bodies Nomenclature of the International Astronomical Union.

Near-Earth obj.	MBA (inner)	MBA (outer)	Centaur
Mars-crosser	MBA (middle)	Jupiter trojan	Trans-Neptunian obj.
Unclassified

== 108001–108100 ==
Designation			Discovery			Properties		Ref
Permanent	Provisional	Named after	Date	Site	Discoverer(s)	Category	Diam.	Ref
108001	2001 FY_{137}	—	March 21, 2001	Anderson Mesa	LONEOS	V	1.3 km	MPC · JPL
108002	2001 FZ_{137}	—	March 21, 2001	Anderson Mesa	LONEOS	·	1.5 km	MPC · JPL
108003	2001 FL_{138}	—	March 21, 2001	Haleakala	NEAT	·	1.6 km	MPC · JPL
108004	2001 FS_{138}	—	March 21, 2001	Haleakala	NEAT	·	5.0 km	MPC · JPL
108005	2001 FX_{138}	—	March 21, 2001	Haleakala	NEAT	·	1.6 km	MPC · JPL
108006	2001 FA_{140}	—	March 21, 2001	Haleakala	NEAT	·	7.8 km	MPC · JPL
108007	2001 FD_{141}	—	March 23, 2001	Socorro	LINEAR	EUN	2.5 km	MPC · JPL
108008	2001 FK_{141}	—	March 23, 2001	Anderson Mesa	LONEOS	·	2.3 km	MPC · JPL
108009	2001 FX_{142}	—	March 23, 2001	Haleakala	NEAT	·	2.4 km	MPC · JPL
108010	2001 FF_{143}	—	March 23, 2001	Kitt Peak	Spacewatch	MAS	1.5 km	MPC · JPL
108011	2001 FM_{143}	—	March 23, 2001	Anderson Mesa	LONEOS	·	1.6 km	MPC · JPL
108012	2001 FV_{143}	—	March 23, 2001	Anderson Mesa	LONEOS	·	3.8 km	MPC · JPL
108013	2001 FX_{143}	—	March 23, 2001	Anderson Mesa	LONEOS	·	1.3 km	MPC · JPL
108014	2001 FD_{144}	—	March 23, 2001	Anderson Mesa	LONEOS	·	3.1 km	MPC · JPL
108015	2001 FU_{144}	—	March 23, 2001	Haleakala	NEAT	·	5.0 km	MPC · JPL
108016	2001 FE_{145}	—	March 23, 2001	Haleakala	NEAT	·	4.1 km	MPC · JPL
108017	2001 FG_{146}	—	March 24, 2001	Anderson Mesa	LONEOS	·	2.6 km	MPC · JPL
108018	2001 FO_{146}	—	March 24, 2001	Anderson Mesa	LONEOS	·	2.5 km	MPC · JPL
108019	2001 FS_{146}	—	March 24, 2001	Anderson Mesa	LONEOS	·	1.1 km	MPC · JPL
108020	2001 FG_{147}	—	March 24, 2001	Socorro	LINEAR	NYS	2.0 km	MPC · JPL
108021	2001 FL_{147}	—	March 24, 2001	Anderson Mesa	LONEOS	·	1.3 km	MPC · JPL
108022	2001 FO_{147}	—	March 24, 2001	Socorro	LINEAR	NYS	2.4 km	MPC · JPL
108023	2001 FH_{148}	—	March 24, 2001	Anderson Mesa	LONEOS	·	2.5 km	MPC · JPL
108024	2001 FF_{149}	—	March 24, 2001	Socorro	LINEAR	·	2.4 km	MPC · JPL
108025	2001 FK_{149}	—	March 24, 2001	Anderson Mesa	LONEOS	·	2.8 km	MPC · JPL
108026	2001 FL_{149}	—	March 24, 2001	Anderson Mesa	LONEOS	·	3.3 km	MPC · JPL
108027	2001 FQ_{149}	—	March 24, 2001	Anderson Mesa	LONEOS	·	2.2 km	MPC · JPL
108028	2001 FY_{149}	—	March 24, 2001	Anderson Mesa	LONEOS	·	1.5 km	MPC · JPL
108029	2001 FX_{150}	—	March 24, 2001	Kitt Peak	Spacewatch	·	1.2 km	MPC · JPL
108030	2001 FQ_{151}	—	March 24, 2001	Haleakala	NEAT	·	2.5 km	MPC · JPL
108031	2001 FC_{152}	—	March 26, 2001	Socorro	LINEAR	·	2.1 km	MPC · JPL
108032	2001 FJ_{153}	—	March 26, 2001	Socorro	LINEAR	·	1.7 km	MPC · JPL
108033	2001 FQ_{153}	—	March 26, 2001	Socorro	LINEAR	·	1.2 km	MPC · JPL
108034	2001 FR_{153}	—	March 26, 2001	Socorro	LINEAR	·	6.1 km	MPC · JPL
108035	2001 FC_{154}	—	March 26, 2001	Haleakala	NEAT	·	2.1 km	MPC · JPL
108036	2001 FK_{154}	—	March 26, 2001	Socorro	LINEAR	HYG	6.6 km	MPC · JPL
108037	2001 FR_{154}	—	March 26, 2001	Socorro	LINEAR	·	2.4 km	MPC · JPL
108038	2001 FV_{154}	—	March 26, 2001	Socorro	LINEAR	·	1.8 km	MPC · JPL
108039	2001 FY_{154}	—	March 26, 2001	Socorro	LINEAR	·	7.2 km	MPC · JPL
108040	2001 FA_{155}	—	March 26, 2001	Socorro	LINEAR	·	4.1 km	MPC · JPL
108041	2001 FD_{155}	—	March 26, 2001	Socorro	LINEAR	·	1.4 km	MPC · JPL
108042	2001 FG_{155}	—	March 26, 2001	Socorro	LINEAR	·	1.3 km	MPC · JPL
108043	2001 FQ_{155}	—	March 26, 2001	Socorro	LINEAR	·	2.0 km	MPC · JPL
108044	2001 FW_{155}	—	March 26, 2001	Socorro	LINEAR	·	3.3 km	MPC · JPL
108045	2001 FX_{155}	—	March 26, 2001	Socorro	LINEAR	·	3.8 km	MPC · JPL
108046	2001 FD_{156}	—	March 26, 2001	Haleakala	NEAT	MAS	1.2 km	MPC · JPL
108047	2001 FC_{157}	—	March 27, 2001	Anderson Mesa	LONEOS	MRX	2.4 km	MPC · JPL
108048	2001 FD_{157}	—	March 27, 2001	Anderson Mesa	LONEOS	·	2.8 km	MPC · JPL
108049	2001 FE_{157}	—	March 27, 2001	Anderson Mesa	LONEOS	·	2.6 km	MPC · JPL
108050	2001 FK_{157}	—	March 27, 2001	Anderson Mesa	LONEOS	·	2.7 km	MPC · JPL
108051	2001 FO_{157}	—	March 27, 2001	Anderson Mesa	LONEOS	·	2.6 km	MPC · JPL
108052	2001 FN_{158}	—	March 27, 2001	Haleakala	NEAT	·	2.4 km	MPC · JPL
108053	2001 FO_{158}	—	March 27, 2001	Haleakala	NEAT	·	1.3 km	MPC · JPL
108054	2001 FQ_{158}	—	March 27, 2001	Haleakala	NEAT	·	1.7 km	MPC · JPL
108055	2001 FS_{158}	—	March 27, 2001	Haleakala	NEAT	·	3.8 km	MPC · JPL
108056	2001 FL_{159}	—	March 29, 2001	Anderson Mesa	LONEOS	·	3.6 km	MPC · JPL
108057	2001 FN_{159}	—	March 29, 2001	Anderson Mesa	LONEOS	·	1.9 km	MPC · JPL
108058	2001 FA_{160}	—	March 29, 2001	Anderson Mesa	LONEOS	·	1.8 km	MPC · JPL
108059	2001 FF_{160}	—	March 29, 2001	Anderson Mesa	LONEOS	·	2.5 km	MPC · JPL
108060	2001 FU_{160}	—	March 29, 2001	Socorro	LINEAR	·	2.9 km	MPC · JPL
108061	2001 FD_{161}	—	March 29, 2001	Haleakala	NEAT	·	2.8 km	MPC · JPL
108062	2001 FG_{161}	—	March 29, 2001	Haleakala	NEAT	·	1.7 km	MPC · JPL
108063	2001 FV_{161}	—	March 30, 2001	Kitt Peak	Spacewatch	LEO	4.8 km	MPC · JPL
108064	2001 FY_{161}	—	March 30, 2001	Socorro	LINEAR	·	4.1 km	MPC · JPL
108065	2001 FE_{162}	—	March 30, 2001	Haleakala	NEAT	·	5.5 km	MPC · JPL
108066	2001 FJ_{164}	—	March 18, 2001	Socorro	LINEAR	·	2.0 km	MPC · JPL
108067	2001 FO_{165}	—	March 19, 2001	Socorro	LINEAR	slow	2.0 km	MPC · JPL
108068	2001 FY_{166}	—	March 19, 2001	Haleakala	NEAT	·	1.9 km	MPC · JPL
108069	2001 FB_{167}	—	March 19, 2001	Haleakala	NEAT	·	3.5 km	MPC · JPL
108070	2001 FC_{167}	—	March 19, 2001	Socorro	LINEAR	·	2.8 km	MPC · JPL
108071	2001 FS_{167}	—	March 19, 2001	Anderson Mesa	LONEOS	MAR	2.3 km	MPC · JPL
108072 Odifreddi	2001 FN_{168}	Odifreddi	March 22, 2001	Cima Ekar	ADAS	HOF	4.3 km	MPC · JPL
108073	2001 FZ_{168}	—	March 23, 2001	Anderson Mesa	LONEOS	·	7.5 km	MPC · JPL
108074	2001 FK_{169}	—	March 23, 2001	Anderson Mesa	LONEOS	·	1.8 km	MPC · JPL
108075	2001 FO_{169}	—	March 23, 2001	Haleakala	NEAT	fast	4.9 km	MPC · JPL
108076	2001 FC_{170}	—	March 24, 2001	Anderson Mesa	LONEOS	·	2.8 km	MPC · JPL
108077	2001 FL_{170}	—	March 24, 2001	Socorro	LINEAR	·	2.0 km	MPC · JPL
108078	2001 FO_{170}	—	March 24, 2001	Anderson Mesa	LONEOS	·	2.9 km	MPC · JPL
108079	2001 FV_{170}	—	March 24, 2001	Anderson Mesa	LONEOS	NYS	1.4 km	MPC · JPL
108080	2001 FJ_{171}	—	March 24, 2001	Haleakala	NEAT	·	3.4 km	MPC · JPL
108081	2001 FM_{171}	—	March 24, 2001	Haleakala	NEAT	BAR	3.3 km	MPC · JPL
108082	2001 FX_{171}	—	March 24, 2001	Haleakala	NEAT	·	2.7 km	MPC · JPL
108083	2001 FG_{172}	—	March 24, 2001	Haleakala	NEAT	EUN	2.4 km	MPC · JPL
108084	2001 FL_{172}	—	March 24, 2001	Haleakala	NEAT	PHO	4.8 km	MPC · JPL
108085	2001 FP_{172}	—	March 25, 2001	Anderson Mesa	LONEOS	·	2.9 km	MPC · JPL
108086	2001 FQ_{173}	—	March 21, 2001	Kitt Peak	Spacewatch	·	2.0 km	MPC · JPL
108087	2001 FJ_{174}	—	March 19, 2001	Uccle	T. Pauwels	·	2.3 km	MPC · JPL
108088	2001 FD_{175}	—	March 20, 2001	Anderson Mesa	LONEOS	·	1.7 km	MPC · JPL
108089	2001 FE_{175}	—	March 20, 2001	Anderson Mesa	LONEOS	·	4.2 km	MPC · JPL
108090	2001 FG_{176}	—	March 16, 2001	Socorro	LINEAR	·	3.3 km	MPC · JPL
108091	2001 FR_{176}	—	March 16, 2001	Socorro	LINEAR	·	7.9 km	MPC · JPL
108092	2001 FP_{177}	—	March 18, 2001	Socorro	LINEAR	NYS	2.1 km	MPC · JPL
108093	2001 FX_{177}	—	March 19, 2001	Socorro	LINEAR	EUN	3.4 km	MPC · JPL
108094	2001 FO_{178}	—	March 20, 2001	Anderson Mesa	LONEOS	MAR	2.2 km	MPC · JPL
108095	2001 FD_{179}	—	March 20, 2001	Anderson Mesa	LONEOS	EOS	4.8 km	MPC · JPL
108096 Melvin	2001 FY_{183}	Melvin	March 25, 2001	Kitt Peak	M. W. Buie	·	2.3 km	MPC · JPL
108097 Satcher	2001 FO_{184}	Satcher	March 26, 2001	Kitt Peak	M. W. Buie	MRX	1.8 km	MPC · JPL
108098	2001 FH_{186}	—	March 16, 2001	Socorro	LINEAR	·	4.3 km	MPC · JPL
108099	2001 FA_{187}	—	March 18, 2001	Haleakala	NEAT	·	4.6 km	MPC · JPL
108100	2001 FG_{188}	—	March 16, 2001	Socorro	LINEAR	PHO	1.7 km	MPC · JPL

== 108101–108200 ==
back to top

Designation			Discovery			Properties		Ref
Permanent	Provisional	Named after	Date	Site	Discoverer(s)	Category	Diam.	Ref
108101	2001 FM_{188}	—	March 16, 2001	Socorro	LINEAR	·	4.5 km	MPC · JPL
108102	2001 FN_{188}	—	March 16, 2001	Socorro	LINEAR	EUN	1.8 km	MPC · JPL
108103	2001 FY_{188}	—	March 16, 2001	Socorro	LINEAR	·	6.4 km	MPC · JPL
108104	2001 FM_{189}	—	March 18, 2001	Socorro	LINEAR	WIT	2.1 km	MPC · JPL
108105	2001 FT_{189}	—	March 18, 2001	Socorro	LINEAR	·	3.5 km	MPC · JPL
108106	2001 FY_{190}	—	March 19, 2001	Socorro	LINEAR	·	1.8 km	MPC · JPL
108107	2001 FU_{191}	—	March 21, 2001	Haleakala	NEAT	·	1.8 km	MPC · JPL
108108	2001 FA_{192}	—	March 22, 2001	Cima Ekar	ADAS	·	2.0 km	MPC · JPL
108109	2001 FP_{192}	—	March 24, 2001	Anderson Mesa	LONEOS	·	2.1 km	MPC · JPL
108110	2001 FB_{194}	—	March 20, 2001	Anderson Mesa	LONEOS	·	4.6 km	MPC · JPL
108111	2001 FY_{194}	—	March 19, 2001	Anderson Mesa	LONEOS	(5)	3.3 km	MPC · JPL
108112	2001 FC_{195}	—	March 23, 2001	Anderson Mesa	LONEOS	·	2.3 km	MPC · JPL
108113 Maza	2001 GK_{1}	Maza	April 14, 2001	Pla D'Arguines	R. Ferrando	·	4.7 km	MPC · JPL
108114	2001 GP_{1}	—	April 15, 2001	Desert Beaver	W. K. Y. Yeung	ADE	5.6 km	MPC · JPL
108115	2001 GA_{2}	—	April 13, 2001	Kitt Peak	Spacewatch	·	5.8 km	MPC · JPL
108116	2001 GX_{2}	—	April 14, 2001	Socorro	LINEAR	·	6.0 km	MPC · JPL
108117	2001 GH_{3}	—	April 14, 2001	Socorro	LINEAR	PHO	2.8 km	MPC · JPL
108118	2001 GA_{4}	—	April 14, 2001	Socorro	LINEAR	·	2.8 km	MPC · JPL
108119	2001 GS_{4}	—	April 15, 2001	Socorro	LINEAR	MAR	2.1 km	MPC · JPL
108120	2001 GT_{4}	—	April 15, 2001	Socorro	LINEAR	·	3.9 km	MPC · JPL
108121	2001 GW_{4}	—	April 15, 2001	Socorro	LINEAR	·	4.6 km	MPC · JPL
108122	2001 GX_{5}	—	April 14, 2001	Kitt Peak	Spacewatch	·	5.2 km	MPC · JPL
108123	2001 GE_{6}	—	April 14, 2001	Kitt Peak	Spacewatch	·	2.5 km	MPC · JPL
108124	2001 GS_{6}	—	April 15, 2001	Anderson Mesa	LONEOS	·	2.5 km	MPC · JPL
108125	2001 GW_{6}	—	April 15, 2001	Socorro	LINEAR	ADE	4.4 km	MPC · JPL
108126	2001 GD_{7}	—	April 15, 2001	Socorro	LINEAR	·	2.5 km	MPC · JPL
108127	2001 GQ_{7}	—	April 15, 2001	Socorro	LINEAR	·	2.6 km	MPC · JPL
108128	2001 GG_{8}	—	April 15, 2001	Socorro	LINEAR	·	1.8 km	MPC · JPL
108129	2001 GK_{8}	—	April 15, 2001	Socorro	LINEAR	V	1.1 km	MPC · JPL
108130	2001 GM_{8}	—	April 15, 2001	Socorro	LINEAR	·	1.5 km	MPC · JPL
108131	2001 GT_{8}	—	April 15, 2001	Socorro	LINEAR	·	2.5 km	MPC · JPL
108132	2001 GO_{9}	—	April 15, 2001	Socorro	LINEAR	·	2.3 km	MPC · JPL
108133	2001 GS_{9}	—	April 15, 2001	Socorro	LINEAR	EUN	2.1 km	MPC · JPL
108134	2001 GT_{9}	—	April 15, 2001	Socorro	LINEAR	ADE	4.5 km	MPC · JPL
108135	2001 GW_{9}	—	April 15, 2001	Haleakala	NEAT	·	3.7 km	MPC · JPL
108136	2001 GX_{9}	—	April 15, 2001	Haleakala	NEAT	·	1.3 km	MPC · JPL
108137	2001 GJ_{10}	—	April 15, 2001	Haleakala	NEAT	·	1.9 km	MPC · JPL
108138	2001 GB_{11}	—	April 15, 2001	Haleakala	NEAT	·	2.6 km	MPC · JPL
108139	2001 GL_{11}	—	April 14, 2001	Socorro	LINEAR	·	3.3 km	MPC · JPL
108140 Alir	2001 HO	Alir	April 16, 2001	Saint-Véran	St. Veran	·	2.5 km	MPC · JPL
108141	2001 HB_{1}	—	April 16, 2001	Socorro	LINEAR	·	2.9 km	MPC · JPL
108142	2001 HE_{1}	—	April 17, 2001	Socorro	LINEAR	·	6.2 km	MPC · JPL
108143	2001 HK_{1}	—	April 17, 2001	Socorro	LINEAR	·	2.5 km	MPC · JPL
108144	2001 HM_{1}	—	April 17, 2001	Socorro	LINEAR	V	1.4 km	MPC · JPL
108145	2001 HT_{1}	—	April 17, 2001	Socorro	LINEAR	NYS	2.1 km	MPC · JPL
108146	2001 HU_{1}	—	April 17, 2001	Socorro	LINEAR	·	1.2 km	MPC · JPL
108147	2001 HD_{2}	—	April 17, 2001	Socorro	LINEAR	·	3.1 km	MPC · JPL
108148	2001 HE_{2}	—	April 17, 2001	Socorro	LINEAR	EUN	2.9 km	MPC · JPL
108149	2001 HG_{2}	—	April 17, 2001	Socorro	LINEAR	(5)	1.8 km	MPC · JPL
108150	2001 HK_{2}	—	April 17, 2001	Socorro	LINEAR	·	3.7 km	MPC · JPL
108151	2001 HM_{2}	—	April 17, 2001	Socorro	LINEAR	·	2.6 km	MPC · JPL
108152	2001 HO_{2}	—	April 17, 2001	Socorro	LINEAR	EUN	2.6 km	MPC · JPL
108153	2001 HR_{2}	—	April 17, 2001	Socorro	LINEAR	(12739)	3.8 km	MPC · JPL
108154	2001 HK_{3}	—	April 17, 2001	Socorro	LINEAR	·	2.4 km	MPC · JPL
108155	2001 HB_{4}	—	April 18, 2001	Haleakala	NEAT	·	3.7 km	MPC · JPL
108156	2001 HM_{4}	—	April 17, 2001	Desert Beaver	W. K. Y. Yeung	NYS	2.2 km	MPC · JPL
108157	2001 HY_{4}	—	April 16, 2001	Socorro	LINEAR	·	5.0 km	MPC · JPL
108158	2001 HE_{5}	—	April 16, 2001	Socorro	LINEAR	·	5.2 km	MPC · JPL
108159	2001 HG_{5}	—	April 18, 2001	Socorro	LINEAR	·	1.9 km	MPC · JPL
108160	2001 HK_{5}	—	April 18, 2001	Socorro	LINEAR	EUN	2.3 km	MPC · JPL
108161	2001 HV_{5}	—	April 18, 2001	Socorro	LINEAR	·	3.2 km	MPC · JPL
108162	2001 HY_{5}	—	April 18, 2001	Socorro	LINEAR	V	1.6 km	MPC · JPL
108163	2001 HA_{6}	—	April 18, 2001	Socorro	LINEAR	MAR · slow	4.4 km	MPC · JPL
108164	2001 HD_{6}	—	April 18, 2001	Socorro	LINEAR	·	2.7 km	MPC · JPL
108165	2001 HH_{6}	—	April 18, 2001	Socorro	LINEAR	·	2.8 km	MPC · JPL
108166	2001 HO_{7}	—	April 21, 2001	Kitt Peak	Spacewatch	·	1.8 km	MPC · JPL
108167	2001 HF_{8}	—	April 18, 2001	Kitt Peak	Spacewatch	(7744)	2.6 km	MPC · JPL
108168	2001 HG_{8}	—	April 18, 2001	Kitt Peak	Spacewatch	(5)	2.1 km	MPC · JPL
108169	2001 HL_{8}	—	April 21, 2001	Kitt Peak	Spacewatch	·	1.8 km	MPC · JPL
108170	2001 HG_{9}	—	April 16, 2001	Socorro	LINEAR	EUN	2.2 km	MPC · JPL
108171	2001 HQ_{9}	—	April 16, 2001	Socorro	LINEAR	·	2.7 km	MPC · JPL
108172	2001 HC_{10}	—	April 16, 2001	Socorro	LINEAR	·	3.5 km	MPC · JPL
108173	2001 HB_{11}	—	April 17, 2001	Socorro	LINEAR	·	3.3 km	MPC · JPL
108174	2001 HH_{11}	—	April 18, 2001	Socorro	LINEAR	MIS	4.5 km	MPC · JPL
108175	2001 HD_{12}	—	April 18, 2001	Socorro	LINEAR	NYS	2.4 km	MPC · JPL
108176	2001 HK_{12}	—	April 18, 2001	Socorro	LINEAR	·	1.3 km	MPC · JPL
108177	2001 HW_{12}	—	April 18, 2001	Socorro	LINEAR	·	1.5 km	MPC · JPL
108178	2001 HZ_{12}	—	April 18, 2001	Socorro	LINEAR	V · fast	1.1 km	MPC · JPL
108179	2001 HK_{13}	—	April 18, 2001	Socorro	LINEAR	·	2.5 km	MPC · JPL
108180	2001 HM_{13}	—	April 18, 2001	Socorro	LINEAR	·	2.0 km	MPC · JPL
108181	2001 HV_{13}	—	April 21, 2001	Socorro	LINEAR	·	1.3 km	MPC · JPL
108182	2001 HY_{13}	—	April 23, 2001	Kitt Peak	Spacewatch	·	1.6 km	MPC · JPL
108183	2001 HG_{14}	—	April 23, 2001	Reedy Creek	J. Broughton	NYS	2.1 km	MPC · JPL
108184	2001 HH_{15}	—	April 23, 2001	Anderson Mesa	LONEOS	·	3.3 km	MPC · JPL
108185	2001 HK_{15}	—	April 24, 2001	Anderson Mesa	LONEOS	·	2.3 km	MPC · JPL
108186	2001 HX_{15}	—	April 24, 2001	Reedy Creek	J. Broughton	·	3.4 km	MPC · JPL
108187	2001 HF_{16}	—	April 23, 2001	Desert Beaver	W. K. Y. Yeung	·	1.4 km	MPC · JPL
108188	2001 HH_{16}	—	April 23, 2001	Desert Beaver	W. K. Y. Yeung	RAF	1.9 km	MPC · JPL
108189	2001 HK_{16}	—	April 23, 2001	Desert Beaver	W. K. Y. Yeung	·	2.6 km	MPC · JPL
108190	2001 HL_{16}	—	April 23, 2001	Desert Beaver	W. K. Y. Yeung	·	2.4 km	MPC · JPL
108191	2001 HK_{17}	—	April 24, 2001	Kitt Peak	Spacewatch	·	2.2 km	MPC · JPL
108192	2001 HQ_{17}	—	April 24, 2001	Kitt Peak	Spacewatch	·	1.8 km	MPC · JPL
108193	2001 HS_{17}	—	April 24, 2001	Kitt Peak	Spacewatch	LEO	3.8 km	MPC · JPL
108194	2001 HF_{18}	—	April 21, 2001	Socorro	LINEAR	·	4.0 km	MPC · JPL
108195	2001 HK_{18}	—	April 21, 2001	Socorro	LINEAR	·	5.5 km	MPC · JPL
108196	2001 HW_{20}	—	April 21, 2001	Socorro	LINEAR	·	3.7 km	MPC · JPL
108197	2001 HQ_{21}	—	April 23, 2001	Socorro	LINEAR	·	1.4 km	MPC · JPL
108198	2001 HS_{21}	—	April 23, 2001	Socorro	LINEAR	·	3.2 km	MPC · JPL
108199	2001 HX_{21}	—	April 23, 2001	Socorro	LINEAR	EUN	5.3 km	MPC · JPL
108200	2001 HY_{21}	—	April 23, 2001	Socorro	LINEAR	·	1.1 km	MPC · JPL

== 108201–108300 ==
back to top

Designation			Discovery			Properties		Ref
Permanent	Provisional	Named after	Date	Site	Discoverer(s)	Category	Diam.	Ref
108201 Di Blasi	2001 HJ_{22}	Di Blasi	April 27, 2001	Farra d'Isonzo	Farra d'Isonzo	·	5.4 km	MPC · JPL
108202	2001 HO_{22}	—	April 25, 2001	Desert Beaver	W. K. Y. Yeung	·	2.6 km	MPC · JPL
108203	2001 HT_{22}	—	April 26, 2001	Desert Beaver	W. K. Y. Yeung	·	3.6 km	MPC · JPL
108204	2001 HX_{22}	—	April 26, 2001	Desert Beaver	W. K. Y. Yeung	·	1.7 km	MPC · JPL
108205 Baccipaolo	2001 HF_{23}	Baccipaolo	April 26, 2001	San Marcello	L. Tesi, G. Forti	·	2.3 km	MPC · JPL
108206	2001 HP_{23}	—	April 26, 2001	Kitt Peak	Spacewatch	·	3.1 km	MPC · JPL
108207	2001 HJ_{26}	—	April 27, 2001	Kitt Peak	Spacewatch	·	2.5 km	MPC · JPL
108208	2001 HS_{27}	—	April 27, 2001	Socorro	LINEAR	·	1.3 km	MPC · JPL
108209	2001 HS_{28}	—	April 27, 2001	Socorro	LINEAR	·	2.1 km	MPC · JPL
108210	2001 HC_{29}	—	April 27, 2001	Socorro	LINEAR	·	2.2 km	MPC · JPL
108211	2001 HL_{29}	—	April 27, 2001	Socorro	LINEAR	·	1.4 km	MPC · JPL
108212	2001 HX_{29}	—	April 27, 2001	Socorro	LINEAR	·	1.4 km	MPC · JPL
108213	2001 HR_{30}	—	April 26, 2001	Kitt Peak	Spacewatch	·	2.2 km	MPC · JPL
108214	2001 HW_{30}	—	April 26, 2001	Kitt Peak	Spacewatch	·	3.7 km	MPC · JPL
108215	2001 HX_{30}	—	April 26, 2001	Kitt Peak	Spacewatch	·	1.1 km	MPC · JPL
108216	2001 HA_{31}	—	April 27, 2001	Kitt Peak	Spacewatch	·	2.1 km	MPC · JPL
108217	2001 HN_{31}	—	April 26, 2001	Desert Beaver	W. K. Y. Yeung	·	4.5 km	MPC · JPL
108218	2001 HR_{31}	—	April 26, 2001	Desert Beaver	W. K. Y. Yeung	·	1.7 km	MPC · JPL
108219	2001 HO_{32}	—	April 23, 2001	Socorro	LINEAR	·	2.5 km	MPC · JPL
108220	2001 HX_{32}	—	April 27, 2001	Socorro	LINEAR	NYS	1.9 km	MPC · JPL
108221	2001 HS_{33}	—	April 27, 2001	Socorro	LINEAR	·	2.8 km	MPC · JPL
108222	2001 HV_{34}	—	April 27, 2001	Socorro	LINEAR	·	1.7 km	MPC · JPL
108223	2001 HX_{34}	—	April 27, 2001	Socorro	LINEAR	·	1.8 km	MPC · JPL
108224	2001 HB_{35}	—	April 27, 2001	Socorro	LINEAR	·	1.8 km	MPC · JPL
108225	2001 HR_{35}	—	April 29, 2001	Socorro	LINEAR	·	2.2 km	MPC · JPL
108226	2001 HT_{35}	—	April 29, 2001	Socorro	LINEAR	·	2.3 km	MPC · JPL
108227	2001 HY_{36}	—	April 29, 2001	Socorro	LINEAR	·	4.6 km	MPC · JPL
108228	2001 HN_{37}	—	April 29, 2001	Socorro	LINEAR	·	4.6 km	MPC · JPL
108229	2001 HW_{37}	—	April 29, 2001	Črni Vrh	Matičič, S.	·	3.2 km	MPC · JPL
108230	2001 HP_{38}	—	April 26, 2001	Kitt Peak	Spacewatch	·	2.6 km	MPC · JPL
108231	2001 HT_{38}	—	April 26, 2001	Kitt Peak	Spacewatch	·	1.1 km	MPC · JPL
108232	2001 HF_{39}	—	April 26, 2001	Kitt Peak	Spacewatch	·	1.8 km	MPC · JPL
108233	2001 HT_{39}	—	April 26, 2001	Kitt Peak	Spacewatch	NYS	1.9 km	MPC · JPL
108234	2001 HO_{40}	—	April 27, 2001	Socorro	LINEAR	PHO	2.9 km	MPC · JPL
108235	2001 HS_{40}	—	April 27, 2001	Socorro	LINEAR	·	3.5 km	MPC · JPL
108236	2001 HU_{40}	—	April 27, 2001	Socorro	LINEAR	·	2.0 km	MPC · JPL
108237	2001 HL_{41}	—	April 30, 2001	Socorro	LINEAR	EUN	2.4 km	MPC · JPL
108238	2001 HP_{41}	—	April 30, 2001	Kitt Peak	Spacewatch	·	3.3 km	MPC · JPL
108239	2001 HT_{42}	—	April 16, 2001	Anderson Mesa	LONEOS	V	1.3 km	MPC · JPL
108240	2001 HE_{44}	—	April 16, 2001	Anderson Mesa	LONEOS	·	1.7 km	MPC · JPL
108241	2001 HG_{44}	—	April 16, 2001	Anderson Mesa	LONEOS	(5)	3.0 km	MPC · JPL
108242	2001 HQ_{44}	—	April 16, 2001	Socorro	LINEAR	·	1.5 km	MPC · JPL
108243	2001 HU_{44}	—	April 16, 2001	Anderson Mesa	LONEOS	·	2.3 km	MPC · JPL
108244	2001 HX_{44}	—	April 16, 2001	Anderson Mesa	LONEOS	·	4.2 km	MPC · JPL
108245	2001 HC_{45}	—	April 16, 2001	Anderson Mesa	LONEOS	EOS	4.8 km	MPC · JPL
108246	2001 HK_{45}	—	April 16, 2001	Socorro	LINEAR	·	1.6 km	MPC · JPL
108247	2001 HM_{45}	—	April 16, 2001	Kitt Peak	Spacewatch	·	2.9 km	MPC · JPL
108248	2001 HS_{45}	—	April 17, 2001	Anderson Mesa	LONEOS	·	2.7 km	MPC · JPL
108249	2001 HY_{45}	—	April 17, 2001	Anderson Mesa	LONEOS	·	1.3 km	MPC · JPL
108250	2001 HH_{46}	—	April 17, 2001	Črni Vrh	Matičič, S.	V	1.5 km	MPC · JPL
108251	2001 HM_{47}	—	April 18, 2001	Haleakala	NEAT	·	2.2 km	MPC · JPL
108252	2001 HZ_{47}	—	April 19, 2001	Haleakala	NEAT	EUN	2.2 km	MPC · JPL
108253	2001 HB_{48}	—	April 21, 2001	Socorro	LINEAR	·	3.3 km	MPC · JPL
108254	2001 HS_{48}	—	April 21, 2001	Socorro	LINEAR	MAR	2.6 km	MPC · JPL
108255	2001 HS_{49}	—	April 21, 2001	Socorro	LINEAR	·	1.6 km	MPC · JPL
108256	2001 HZ_{49}	—	April 21, 2001	Socorro	LINEAR	·	2.7 km	MPC · JPL
108257	2001 HN_{50}	—	April 22, 2001	Kitt Peak	Spacewatch	GEF	3.7 km	MPC · JPL
108258	2001 HY_{50}	—	April 23, 2001	Socorro	LINEAR	EOS	5.1 km	MPC · JPL
108259	2001 HA_{51}	—	April 23, 2001	Socorro	LINEAR	·	1.5 km	MPC · JPL
108260	2001 HF_{51}	—	April 23, 2001	Socorro	LINEAR	·	2.3 km	MPC · JPL
108261	2001 HX_{51}	—	April 23, 2001	Socorro	LINEAR	·	7.9 km	MPC · JPL
108262	2001 HD_{52}	—	April 23, 2001	Socorro	LINEAR	EUN	2.1 km	MPC · JPL
108263	2001 HT_{53}	—	April 23, 2001	Kitt Peak	Spacewatch	·	4.3 km	MPC · JPL
108264	2001 HS_{54}	—	April 24, 2001	Socorro	LINEAR	·	2.2 km	MPC · JPL
108265	2001 HC_{55}	—	April 24, 2001	Socorro	LINEAR	·	2.2 km	MPC · JPL
108266	2001 HD_{55}	—	April 24, 2001	Socorro	LINEAR	·	3.2 km	MPC · JPL
108267	2001 HE_{55}	—	April 24, 2001	Socorro	LINEAR	V	1.2 km	MPC · JPL
108268	2001 HZ_{55}	—	April 24, 2001	Socorro	LINEAR	·	1.5 km	MPC · JPL
108269	2001 HH_{56}	—	April 24, 2001	Palomar	NEAT	·	6.1 km	MPC · JPL
108270	2001 HL_{56}	—	April 24, 2001	Haleakala	NEAT	·	2.7 km	MPC · JPL
108271	2001 HP_{56}	—	April 24, 2001	Haleakala	NEAT	·	1.3 km	MPC · JPL
108272	2001 HS_{56}	—	April 24, 2001	Haleakala	NEAT	·	1.2 km	MPC · JPL
108273	2001 HY_{56}	—	April 24, 2001	Haleakala	NEAT	·	3.5 km	MPC · JPL
108274	2001 HF_{57}	—	April 25, 2001	Anderson Mesa	LONEOS	·	2.2 km	MPC · JPL
108275	2001 HH_{57}	—	April 25, 2001	Anderson Mesa	LONEOS	·	3.2 km	MPC · JPL
108276	2001 HU_{57}	—	April 25, 2001	Anderson Mesa	LONEOS	·	2.9 km	MPC · JPL
108277	2001 HR_{58}	—	April 25, 2001	Haleakala	NEAT	·	3.7 km	MPC · JPL
108278	2001 HF_{59}	—	April 21, 2001	Socorro	LINEAR	·	2.2 km	MPC · JPL
108279	2001 HM_{59}	—	April 23, 2001	Socorro	LINEAR	NYS	2.3 km	MPC · JPL
108280	2001 HA_{60}	—	April 23, 2001	Socorro	LINEAR	·	4.6 km	MPC · JPL
108281	2001 HT_{60}	—	April 24, 2001	Anderson Mesa	LONEOS	·	2.0 km	MPC · JPL
108282	2001 HY_{60}	—	April 24, 2001	Anderson Mesa	LONEOS	EUN	2.5 km	MPC · JPL
108283	2001 HZ_{60}	—	April 24, 2001	Anderson Mesa	LONEOS	·	1.9 km	MPC · JPL
108284	2001 HC_{61}	—	April 24, 2001	Anderson Mesa	LONEOS	·	2.8 km	MPC · JPL
108285	2001 HM_{61}	—	April 24, 2001	Haleakala	NEAT	NYS	1.8 km	MPC · JPL
108286	2001 HQ_{61}	—	April 24, 2001	Haleakala	NEAT	·	4.6 km	MPC · JPL
108287	2001 HT_{61}	—	April 24, 2001	Haleakala	NEAT	·	1.2 km	MPC · JPL
108288	2001 HY_{61}	—	April 25, 2001	Haleakala	NEAT	·	1.1 km	MPC · JPL
108289	2001 HP_{62}	—	April 26, 2001	Anderson Mesa	LONEOS	·	1.6 km	MPC · JPL
108290	2001 HQ_{62}	—	April 26, 2001	Anderson Mesa	LONEOS	·	3.7 km	MPC · JPL
108291	2001 HR_{62}	—	April 26, 2001	Anderson Mesa	LONEOS	·	2.3 km	MPC · JPL
108292	2001 HA_{63}	—	April 26, 2001	Anderson Mesa	LONEOS	·	2.9 km	MPC · JPL
108293	2001 HD_{63}	—	April 26, 2001	Anderson Mesa	LONEOS	NYS	1.9 km	MPC · JPL
108294	2001 HF_{63}	—	April 26, 2001	Anderson Mesa	LONEOS	EUN	3.1 km	MPC · JPL
108295	2001 HK_{64}	—	April 27, 2001	Kitt Peak	Spacewatch	MRX	2.3 km	MPC · JPL
108296	2001 HB_{65}	—	April 28, 2001	Kitt Peak	Spacewatch	·	2.7 km	MPC · JPL
108297	2001 HK_{65}	—	April 30, 2001	Socorro	LINEAR	·	1.6 km	MPC · JPL
108298	2001 HN_{66}	—	April 24, 2001	Kitt Peak	Spacewatch	·	1.6 km	MPC · JPL
108299	2001 HP_{67}	—	April 16, 2001	Socorro	LINEAR	·	1.8 km	MPC · JPL
108300	2001 HR_{67}	—	April 23, 2001	Socorro	LINEAR	·	2.5 km	MPC · JPL

== 108301–108400 ==
back to top

Designation			Discovery			Properties		Ref
Permanent	Provisional	Named after	Date	Site	Discoverer(s)	Category	Diam.	Ref
108301	2001 JK	—	May 2, 2001	Palomar	NEAT	·	4.8 km	MPC · JPL
108302	2001 JL	—	May 2, 2001	Palomar	NEAT	·	6.1 km	MPC · JPL
108303	2001 JN	—	May 2, 2001	Palomar	NEAT	·	4.7 km	MPC · JPL
108304	2001 JP	—	May 2, 2001	Palomar	NEAT	GEF	2.7 km	MPC · JPL
108305	2001 JX	—	May 11, 2001	Ondřejov	L. Kotková	AGN	2.4 km	MPC · JPL
108306	2001 JZ	—	May 11, 2001	Ondřejov	L. Kotková	·	6.0 km	MPC · JPL
108307	2001 JK_{1}	—	May 13, 2001	Olathe	Robinson, L.	·	1.3 km	MPC · JPL
108308	2001 JO_{1}	—	May 13, 2001	Farpoint	G. Hug	·	1.8 km	MPC · JPL
108309	2001 JY_{1}	—	May 15, 2001	Kitt Peak	Spacewatch	V	1.1 km	MPC · JPL
108310	2001 JD_{2}	—	May 15, 2001	Kitt Peak	Spacewatch	·	7.1 km	MPC · JPL
108311	2001 JO_{3}	—	May 15, 2001	Haleakala	NEAT	·	6.7 km	MPC · JPL
108312	2001 JD_{4}	—	May 15, 2001	Haleakala	NEAT	AGN	2.6 km	MPC · JPL
108313	2001 JB_{5}	—	May 15, 2001	Anderson Mesa	LONEOS	·	3.7 km	MPC · JPL
108314	2001 JN_{5}	—	May 14, 2001	Kitt Peak	Spacewatch	·	3.1 km	MPC · JPL
108315	2001 JV_{5}	—	May 15, 2001	Anderson Mesa	LONEOS	·	2.8 km	MPC · JPL
108316	2001 JJ_{6}	—	May 14, 2001	Kitt Peak	Spacewatch	·	1.4 km	MPC · JPL
108317	2001 JT_{6}	—	May 14, 2001	Palomar	NEAT	·	5.3 km	MPC · JPL
108318	2001 JV_{6}	—	May 14, 2001	Haleakala	NEAT	·	1.9 km	MPC · JPL
108319	2001 JV_{7}	—	May 15, 2001	Anderson Mesa	LONEOS	·	2.7 km	MPC · JPL
108320	2001 JW_{7}	—	May 15, 2001	Anderson Mesa	LONEOS	·	2.0 km	MPC · JPL
108321	2001 JG_{8}	—	May 15, 2001	Anderson Mesa	LONEOS	·	2.5 km	MPC · JPL
108322	2001 JC_{9}	—	May 15, 2001	Palomar	NEAT	·	2.6 km	MPC · JPL
108323	2001 JR_{9}	—	May 15, 2001	Haleakala	NEAT	·	2.1 km	MPC · JPL
108324	2001 KB	—	May 16, 2001	Nogales	Tenagra II	·	3.7 km	MPC · JPL
108325	2001 KV	—	May 17, 2001	Socorro	LINEAR	·	4.0 km	MPC · JPL
108326	2001 KY	—	May 17, 2001	Socorro	LINEAR	(18466)	2.6 km	MPC · JPL
108327	2001 KE_{1}	—	May 17, 2001	Socorro	LINEAR	·	1.5 km	MPC · JPL
108328	2001 KG_{1}	—	May 17, 2001	Socorro	LINEAR	·	2.1 km	MPC · JPL
108329	2001 KK_{1}	—	May 17, 2001	Socorro	LINEAR	·	5.8 km	MPC · JPL
108330	2001 KL_{1}	—	May 17, 2001	Socorro	LINEAR	·	2.6 km	MPC · JPL
108331	2001 KD_{2}	—	May 16, 2001	Kitt Peak	Spacewatch	·	3.3 km	MPC · JPL
108332	2001 KP_{2}	—	May 18, 2001	Socorro	LINEAR	·	1.8 km	MPC · JPL
108333	2001 KS_{2}	—	May 18, 2001	Socorro	LINEAR	·	1.5 km	MPC · JPL
108334	2001 KB_{3}	—	May 17, 2001	Socorro	LINEAR	(5)	1.7 km	MPC · JPL
108335	2001 KQ_{3}	—	May 17, 2001	Socorro	LINEAR	·	3.6 km	MPC · JPL
108336	2001 KV_{3}	—	May 17, 2001	Socorro	LINEAR	NYS	1.2 km	MPC · JPL
108337	2001 KX_{3}	—	May 17, 2001	Socorro	LINEAR	V	1.8 km	MPC · JPL
108338	2001 KV_{4}	—	May 17, 2001	Socorro	LINEAR	EUN	2.3 km	MPC · JPL
108339	2001 KD_{5}	—	May 17, 2001	Socorro	LINEAR	·	1.6 km	MPC · JPL
108340	2001 KH_{5}	—	May 17, 2001	Socorro	LINEAR	·	1.6 km	MPC · JPL
108341	2001 KQ_{5}	—	May 17, 2001	Socorro	LINEAR	·	3.1 km	MPC · JPL
108342	2001 KH_{6}	—	May 17, 2001	Socorro	LINEAR	·	2.4 km	MPC · JPL
108343	2001 KK_{7}	—	May 17, 2001	Socorro	LINEAR	·	2.3 km	MPC · JPL
108344	2001 KT_{7}	—	May 18, 2001	Socorro	LINEAR	·	2.4 km	MPC · JPL
108345	2001 KZ_{7}	—	May 18, 2001	Socorro	LINEAR	NYS	1.7 km	MPC · JPL
108346	2001 KE_{8}	—	May 18, 2001	Socorro	LINEAR	KON	4.9 km	MPC · JPL
108347	2001 KS_{8}	—	May 18, 2001	Socorro	LINEAR	V	1.2 km	MPC · JPL
108348	2001 KV_{8}	—	May 18, 2001	Socorro	LINEAR	·	2.6 km	MPC · JPL
108349	2001 KC_{9}	—	May 18, 2001	Socorro	LINEAR	·	2.0 km	MPC · JPL
108350	2001 KK_{9}	—	May 18, 2001	Socorro	LINEAR	MAS	1.3 km	MPC · JPL
108351	2001 KL_{9}	—	May 18, 2001	Socorro	LINEAR	·	2.7 km	MPC · JPL
108352	2001 KT_{9}	—	May 18, 2001	Socorro	LINEAR	EUN	2.1 km	MPC · JPL
108353	2001 KH_{10}	—	May 18, 2001	Socorro	LINEAR	·	9.5 km	MPC · JPL
108354	2001 KS_{10}	—	May 18, 2001	Socorro	LINEAR	·	1.6 km	MPC · JPL
108355	2001 KC_{11}	—	May 18, 2001	Socorro	LINEAR	·	7.9 km	MPC · JPL
108356	2001 KK_{11}	—	May 18, 2001	Socorro	LINEAR	·	2.4 km	MPC · JPL
108357	2001 KU_{11}	—	May 18, 2001	Socorro	LINEAR	·	8.4 km	MPC · JPL
108358	2001 KT_{12}	—	May 18, 2001	Socorro	LINEAR	·	2.3 km	MPC · JPL
108359	2001 KA_{13}	—	May 18, 2001	Socorro	LINEAR	·	2.8 km	MPC · JPL
108360	2001 KZ_{13}	—	May 17, 2001	Socorro	LINEAR	·	2.0 km	MPC · JPL
108361	2001 KW_{14}	—	May 18, 2001	Socorro	LINEAR	GEF ·	6.1 km	MPC · JPL
108362	2001 KY_{14}	—	May 18, 2001	Socorro	LINEAR	(5)	3.6 km	MPC · JPL
108363	2001 KG_{15}	—	May 18, 2001	Socorro	LINEAR	NYS	2.6 km	MPC · JPL
108364	2001 KL_{15}	—	May 18, 2001	Socorro	LINEAR	·	3.4 km	MPC · JPL
108365	2001 KU_{15}	—	May 18, 2001	Socorro	LINEAR	EUN	2.2 km	MPC · JPL
108366	2001 KP_{16}	—	May 18, 2001	Socorro	LINEAR	·	6.5 km	MPC · JPL
108367	2001 KX_{16}	—	May 18, 2001	Socorro	LINEAR	·	1.9 km	MPC · JPL
108368	2001 KP_{17}	—	May 21, 2001	Socorro	LINEAR	·	1.6 km	MPC · JPL
108369	2001 KZ_{17}	—	May 20, 2001	Bergisch Gladbach	W. Bickel	·	2.6 km	MPC · JPL
108370	2001 KS_{18}	—	May 21, 2001	Kitt Peak	Spacewatch	V	1.1 km	MPC · JPL
108371	2001 KF_{19}	—	May 18, 2001	Socorro	LINEAR	·	3.0 km	MPC · JPL
108372	2001 KG_{19}	—	May 18, 2001	Socorro	LINEAR	·	5.0 km	MPC · JPL
108373	2001 KN_{19}	—	May 21, 2001	Socorro	LINEAR	·	1.9 km	MPC · JPL
108374	2001 KX_{19}	—	May 22, 2001	Socorro	LINEAR	MAR	3.3 km	MPC · JPL
108375	2001 KA_{20}	—	May 22, 2001	Socorro	LINEAR	RAF	2.1 km	MPC · JPL
108376	2001 KB_{20}	—	May 22, 2001	Socorro	LINEAR	PHO	1.6 km	MPC · JPL
108377	2001 KG_{20}	—	May 23, 2001	Desert Beaver	W. K. Y. Yeung	·	1.6 km	MPC · JPL
108378	2001 KK_{20}	—	May 22, 2001	Ondřejov	P. Pravec, P. Kušnirák	·	2.0 km	MPC · JPL
108379	2001 KP_{20}	—	May 17, 2001	Kitt Peak	Spacewatch	·	5.2 km	MPC · JPL
108380	2001 KZ_{20}	—	May 21, 2001	Anderson Mesa	LONEOS	MRX	2.2 km	MPC · JPL
108381	2001 KC_{21}	—	May 21, 2001	Anderson Mesa	LONEOS	·	5.1 km	MPC · JPL
108382 Karencilevitz	2001 KM_{21}	Karencilevitz	May 18, 2001	OCA-Anza	M. Collins, White, M.	HNS	2.4 km	MPC · JPL
108383	2001 KB_{23}	—	May 17, 2001	Socorro	LINEAR	NYS	1.8 km	MPC · JPL
108384	2001 KN_{24}	—	May 17, 2001	Socorro	LINEAR	·	2.1 km	MPC · JPL
108385	2001 KQ_{24}	—	May 17, 2001	Socorro	LINEAR	·	2.9 km	MPC · JPL
108386	2001 KZ_{24}	—	May 17, 2001	Socorro	LINEAR	EOS	4.1 km	MPC · JPL
108387	2001 KR_{25}	—	May 17, 2001	Socorro	LINEAR	·	3.1 km	MPC · JPL
108388	2001 KT_{25}	—	May 17, 2001	Socorro	LINEAR	·	2.6 km	MPC · JPL
108389	2001 KA_{26}	—	May 17, 2001	Socorro	LINEAR	·	2.7 km	MPC · JPL
108390	2001 KJ_{26}	—	May 17, 2001	Socorro	LINEAR	V	1.1 km	MPC · JPL
108391	2001 KK_{26}	—	May 17, 2001	Socorro	LINEAR	·	1.6 km	MPC · JPL
108392	2001 KM_{26}	—	May 17, 2001	Socorro	LINEAR	NYS	2.3 km	MPC · JPL
108393	2001 KE_{27}	—	May 17, 2001	Socorro	LINEAR	·	2.4 km	MPC · JPL
108394	2001 KJ_{27}	—	May 17, 2001	Socorro	LINEAR	·	3.0 km	MPC · JPL
108395	2001 KR_{27}	—	May 17, 2001	Socorro	LINEAR	·	9.0 km	MPC · JPL
108396	2001 KS_{27}	—	May 17, 2001	Socorro	LINEAR	MRX	3.3 km	MPC · JPL
108397	2001 KA_{28}	—	May 17, 2001	Socorro	LINEAR	·	4.0 km	MPC · JPL
108398	2001 KB_{28}	—	May 17, 2001	Socorro	LINEAR	·	1.6 km	MPC · JPL
108399	2001 KE_{28}	—	May 18, 2001	Socorro	LINEAR	·	4.1 km	MPC · JPL
108400	2001 KF_{28}	—	May 18, 2001	Socorro	LINEAR	·	1.3 km	MPC · JPL

== 108401–108500 ==
back to top

Designation			Discovery			Properties		Ref
Permanent	Provisional	Named after	Date	Site	Discoverer(s)	Category	Diam.	Ref
108401	2001 KG_{28}	—	May 18, 2001	Socorro	LINEAR	·	3.2 km	MPC · JPL
108402	2001 KP_{28}	—	May 18, 2001	Socorro	LINEAR	·	5.7 km	MPC · JPL
108403	2001 KT_{28}	—	May 21, 2001	Socorro	LINEAR	·	2.1 km	MPC · JPL
108404	2001 KX_{28}	—	May 21, 2001	Socorro	LINEAR	DOR	5.1 km	MPC · JPL
108405	2001 KB_{29}	—	May 21, 2001	Socorro	LINEAR	·	1.6 km	MPC · JPL
108406	2001 KJ_{29}	—	May 21, 2001	Socorro	LINEAR	·	1.9 km	MPC · JPL
108407	2001 KS_{29}	—	May 21, 2001	Socorro	LINEAR	·	1.2 km	MPC · JPL
108408	2001 KQ_{31}	—	May 22, 2001	Socorro	LINEAR	·	5.1 km	MPC · JPL
108409	2001 KY_{31}	—	May 23, 2001	Socorro	LINEAR	EUN	2.3 km	MPC · JPL
108410	2001 KG_{32}	—	May 24, 2001	Kitt Peak	Spacewatch	·	1.5 km	MPC · JPL
108411	2001 KK_{32}	—	May 23, 2001	Socorro	LINEAR	·	2.1 km	MPC · JPL
108412	2001 KM_{33}	—	May 18, 2001	Socorro	LINEAR	ADE	4.2 km	MPC · JPL
108413	2001 KS_{33}	—	May 18, 2001	Socorro	LINEAR	·	3.5 km	MPC · JPL
108414	2001 KT_{33}	—	May 18, 2001	Socorro	LINEAR	·	1.8 km	MPC · JPL
108415	2001 KD_{34}	—	May 18, 2001	Socorro	LINEAR	·	7.2 km	MPC · JPL
108416	2001 KX_{34}	—	May 18, 2001	Socorro	LINEAR	·	2.3 km	MPC · JPL
108417	2001 KO_{35}	—	May 18, 2001	Socorro	LINEAR	·	2.0 km	MPC · JPL
108418	2001 KR_{35}	—	May 18, 2001	Socorro	LINEAR	(5)	1.9 km	MPC · JPL
108419	2001 KU_{35}	—	May 18, 2001	Socorro	LINEAR	·	4.1 km	MPC · JPL
108420	2001 KE_{36}	—	May 18, 2001	Socorro	LINEAR	·	1.6 km	MPC · JPL
108421	2001 KJ_{36}	—	May 18, 2001	Socorro	LINEAR	·	4.0 km	MPC · JPL
108422	2001 KS_{36}	—	May 21, 2001	Socorro	LINEAR	NYS	1.8 km	MPC · JPL
108423	2001 KO_{37}	—	May 22, 2001	Socorro	LINEAR	·	3.9 km	MPC · JPL
108424	2001 KV_{37}	—	May 22, 2001	Socorro	LINEAR	·	2.2 km	MPC · JPL
108425	2001 KC_{38}	—	May 22, 2001	Socorro	LINEAR	·	3.2 km	MPC · JPL
108426	2001 KG_{38}	—	May 22, 2001	Socorro	LINEAR	BRG	3.5 km	MPC · JPL
108427	2001 KM_{38}	—	May 22, 2001	Socorro	LINEAR	·	2.4 km	MPC · JPL
108428	2001 KB_{39}	—	May 22, 2001	Socorro	LINEAR	·	2.8 km	MPC · JPL
108429	2001 KK_{39}	—	May 22, 2001	Socorro	LINEAR	·	2.6 km	MPC · JPL
108430	2001 KX_{39}	—	May 22, 2001	Socorro	LINEAR	EUN	2.4 km	MPC · JPL
108431	2001 KD_{40}	—	May 22, 2001	Socorro	LINEAR	·	4.0 km	MPC · JPL
108432	2001 KS_{40}	—	May 23, 2001	Socorro	LINEAR	·	2.3 km	MPC · JPL
108433	2001 KY_{40}	—	May 23, 2001	Socorro	LINEAR	·	2.7 km	MPC · JPL
108434	2001 KM_{41}	—	May 24, 2001	Socorro	LINEAR	·	1.5 km	MPC · JPL
108435	2001 KU_{41}	—	May 24, 2001	Palomar	NEAT	·	6.0 km	MPC · JPL
108436	2001 KU_{42}	—	May 22, 2001	Socorro	LINEAR	V	1 km	MPC · JPL
108437	2001 KV_{42}	—	May 22, 2001	Socorro	LINEAR	·	4.2 km	MPC · JPL
108438	2001 KY_{43}	—	May 22, 2001	Socorro	LINEAR	·	1.4 km	MPC · JPL
108439	2001 KE_{44}	—	May 22, 2001	Socorro	LINEAR	·	2.4 km	MPC · JPL
108440	2001 KP_{44}	—	May 22, 2001	Socorro	LINEAR	·	4.4 km	MPC · JPL
108441	2001 KT_{44}	—	May 22, 2001	Socorro	LINEAR	·	2.4 km	MPC · JPL
108442	2001 KH_{45}	—	May 22, 2001	Socorro	LINEAR	·	3.2 km	MPC · JPL
108443	2001 KU_{45}	—	May 22, 2001	Socorro	LINEAR	DOR	6.5 km	MPC · JPL
108444	2001 KM_{46}	—	May 22, 2001	Socorro	LINEAR	fast	2.2 km	MPC · JPL
108445	2001 KZ_{46}	—	May 22, 2001	Socorro	LINEAR	·	5.6 km	MPC · JPL
108446	2001 KJ_{47}	—	May 24, 2001	Socorro	LINEAR	·	2.5 km	MPC · JPL
108447	2001 KN_{47}	—	May 24, 2001	Socorro	LINEAR	·	1.2 km	MPC · JPL
108448	2001 KS_{47}	—	May 24, 2001	Socorro	LINEAR	·	1.8 km	MPC · JPL
108449	2001 KW_{48}	—	May 24, 2001	Socorro	LINEAR	·	1.9 km	MPC · JPL
108450	2001 KA_{49}	—	May 24, 2001	Socorro	LINEAR	·	4.1 km	MPC · JPL
108451	2001 KG_{49}	—	May 24, 2001	Socorro	LINEAR	MAS	1.5 km	MPC · JPL
108452	2001 KJ_{49}	—	May 24, 2001	Socorro	LINEAR	·	5.6 km	MPC · JPL
108453	2001 KW_{49}	—	May 24, 2001	Socorro	LINEAR	·	2.1 km	MPC · JPL
108454	2001 KC_{50}	—	May 24, 2001	Socorro	LINEAR	·	2.3 km	MPC · JPL
108455	2001 KD_{50}	—	May 24, 2001	Socorro	LINEAR	·	10 km	MPC · JPL
108456	2001 KW_{50}	—	May 24, 2001	Kitt Peak	Spacewatch	JUN	2.2 km	MPC · JPL
108457	2001 KF_{51}	—	May 24, 2001	Socorro	LINEAR	·	2.3 km	MPC · JPL
108458	2001 KA_{53}	—	May 18, 2001	Anderson Mesa	LONEOS	ADE	2.4 km	MPC · JPL
108459	2001 KB_{53}	—	May 18, 2001	Socorro	LINEAR	·	1.3 km	MPC · JPL
108460	2001 KP_{53}	—	May 18, 2001	Haleakala	NEAT	·	3.8 km	MPC · JPL
108461	2001 KG_{54}	—	May 22, 2001	Haleakala	NEAT	MIS	4.0 km	MPC · JPL
108462	2001 KS_{54}	—	May 18, 2001	Anderson Mesa	LONEOS	·	2.1 km	MPC · JPL
108463	2001 KP_{55}	—	May 22, 2001	Socorro	LINEAR	ERI	3.5 km	MPC · JPL
108464	2001 KQ_{55}	—	May 22, 2001	Socorro	LINEAR	HNS	2.8 km	MPC · JPL
108465	2001 KB_{56}	—	May 22, 2001	Socorro	LINEAR	·	4.8 km	MPC · JPL
108466	2001 KM_{56}	—	May 23, 2001	Socorro	LINEAR	·	13 km	MPC · JPL
108467	2001 KQ_{56}	—	May 23, 2001	Socorro	LINEAR	·	3.6 km	MPC · JPL
108468	2001 KR_{56}	—	May 23, 2001	Socorro	LINEAR	·	2.6 km	MPC · JPL
108469	2001 KW_{56}	—	May 23, 2001	Socorro	LINEAR	·	4.1 km	MPC · JPL
108470	2001 KX_{56}	—	May 23, 2001	Socorro	LINEAR	·	3.2 km	MPC · JPL
108471	2001 KE_{57}	—	May 23, 2001	Socorro	LINEAR	·	3.8 km	MPC · JPL
108472	2001 KF_{57}	—	May 23, 2001	Socorro	LINEAR	fast?	5.1 km	MPC · JPL
108473	2001 KJ_{57}	—	May 24, 2001	Socorro	LINEAR	·	2.9 km	MPC · JPL
108474	2001 KN_{57}	—	May 24, 2001	Socorro	LINEAR	EUN	2.1 km	MPC · JPL
108475	2001 KH_{58}	—	May 26, 2001	Socorro	LINEAR	·	2.0 km	MPC · JPL
108476	2001 KK_{58}	—	May 26, 2001	Socorro	LINEAR	·	5.3 km	MPC · JPL
108477	2001 KL_{58}	—	May 26, 2001	Socorro	LINEAR	fast	3.0 km	MPC · JPL
108478	2001 KT_{58}	—	May 26, 2001	Socorro	LINEAR	V	1.3 km	MPC · JPL
108479	2001 KE_{60}	—	May 27, 2001	Haleakala	NEAT	·	1.9 km	MPC · JPL
108480	2001 KJ_{60}	—	May 16, 2001	Haleakala	NEAT	·	1.5 km	MPC · JPL
108481	2001 KO_{60}	—	May 16, 2001	Haleakala	NEAT	·	4.8 km	MPC · JPL
108482	2001 KC_{61}	—	May 17, 2001	Socorro	LINEAR	·	3.0 km	MPC · JPL
108483	2001 KJ_{61}	—	May 17, 2001	Haleakala	NEAT	ERI	3.2 km	MPC · JPL
108484	2001 KL_{61}	—	May 18, 2001	Socorro	LINEAR	·	2.6 km	MPC · JPL
108485	2001 KM_{61}	—	May 18, 2001	Anderson Mesa	LONEOS	·	2.7 km	MPC · JPL
108486	2001 KL_{62}	—	May 18, 2001	Socorro	LINEAR	·	4.2 km	MPC · JPL
108487	2001 KR_{62}	—	May 18, 2001	Anderson Mesa	LONEOS	·	2.0 km	MPC · JPL
108488	2001 KT_{62}	—	May 18, 2001	Anderson Mesa	LONEOS	·	4.9 km	MPC · JPL
108489	2001 KV_{62}	—	May 18, 2001	Anderson Mesa	LONEOS	·	4.8 km	MPC · JPL
108490	2001 KB_{63}	—	May 18, 2001	Haleakala	NEAT	·	3.0 km	MPC · JPL
108491	2001 KF_{63}	—	May 18, 2001	Haleakala	NEAT	·	3.1 km	MPC · JPL
108492	2001 KT_{63}	—	May 20, 2001	Haleakala	NEAT	·	2.3 km	MPC · JPL
108493	2001 KU_{63}	—	May 20, 2001	Haleakala	NEAT	EUN	2.8 km	MPC · JPL
108494	2001 KA_{64}	—	May 21, 2001	Socorro	LINEAR	·	3.3 km	MPC · JPL
108495	2001 KB_{64}	—	May 21, 2001	Anderson Mesa	LONEOS	·	3.0 km	MPC · JPL
108496 Sullenberger	2001 KD_{64}	Sullenberger	May 21, 2001	Goodricke-Pigott	R. A. Tucker	EUN	2.7 km	MPC · JPL
108497	2001 KJ_{64}	—	May 21, 2001	Anderson Mesa	LONEOS	·	2.0 km	MPC · JPL
108498	2001 KA_{65}	—	May 22, 2001	Anderson Mesa	LONEOS	·	3.0 km	MPC · JPL
108499	2001 KG_{65}	—	May 22, 2001	Anderson Mesa	LONEOS	·	3.4 km	MPC · JPL
108500	2001 KZ_{65}	—	May 22, 2001	Anderson Mesa	LONEOS	GEF	2.9 km	MPC · JPL

== 108501–108600 ==
back to top

Designation			Discovery			Properties		Ref
Permanent	Provisional	Named after	Date	Site	Discoverer(s)	Category	Diam.	Ref
108501	2001 KG_{66}	—	May 22, 2001	Anderson Mesa	LONEOS	·	2.1 km	MPC · JPL
108502	2001 KR_{66}	—	May 23, 2001	Haleakala	NEAT	·	3.1 km	MPC · JPL
108503	2001 KH_{67}	—	May 25, 2001	Kitt Peak	Spacewatch	·	4.0 km	MPC · JPL
108504	2001 KG_{68}	—	May 29, 2001	Palomar	NEAT	·	3.4 km	MPC · JPL
108505	2001 KJ_{68}	—	May 18, 2001	Anderson Mesa	LONEOS	·	3.2 km	MPC · JPL
108506	2001 KU_{68}	—	May 21, 2001	Socorro	LINEAR	·	1.6 km	MPC · JPL
108507	2001 KB_{69}	—	May 21, 2001	Kitt Peak	Spacewatch	·	2.2 km	MPC · JPL
108508	2001 KD_{69}	—	May 21, 2001	Kitt Peak	Spacewatch	·	1.8 km	MPC · JPL
108509	2001 KO_{69}	—	May 22, 2001	Anderson Mesa	LONEOS	·	3.2 km	MPC · JPL
108510	2001 KD_{71}	—	May 24, 2001	Anderson Mesa	LONEOS	MRX	2.0 km	MPC · JPL
108511	2001 KO_{72}	—	May 24, 2001	Socorro	LINEAR	·	2.8 km	MPC · JPL
108512	2001 KX_{73}	—	May 25, 2001	Socorro	LINEAR	·	1.6 km	MPC · JPL
108513	2001 KP_{74}	—	May 26, 2001	Socorro	LINEAR	·	2.3 km	MPC · JPL
108514	2001 KQ_{74}	—	May 26, 2001	Socorro	LINEAR	GEF	2.3 km	MPC · JPL
108515	2001 KW_{74}	—	May 27, 2001	Haleakala	NEAT	·	4.8 km	MPC · JPL
108516	2001 KR_{75}	—	May 30, 2001	Anderson Mesa	LONEOS	·	2.6 km	MPC · JPL
108517	2001 KV_{75}	—	May 26, 2001	Socorro	LINEAR	·	3.8 km	MPC · JPL
108518	2001 KY_{75}	—	May 29, 2001	Haleakala	NEAT	·	5.4 km	MPC · JPL
108519	2001 LF	—	June 3, 2001	Haleakala	NEAT	AMO +1km	1.4 km	MPC · JPL
108520	2001 LK	—	June 11, 2001	Desert Beaver	W. K. Y. Yeung	V	1.1 km	MPC · JPL
108521	2001 LL	—	June 11, 2001	Desert Beaver	W. K. Y. Yeung	·	7.5 km	MPC · JPL
108522	2001 LQ	—	June 14, 2001	Anderson Mesa	LONEOS	·	7.0 km	MPC · JPL
108523	2001 LT	—	June 12, 2001	Kitt Peak	Spacewatch	·	2.4 km	MPC · JPL
108524	2001 LA_{1}	—	June 13, 2001	Socorro	LINEAR	·	2.2 km	MPC · JPL
108525	2001 LV_{1}	—	June 13, 2001	Socorro	LINEAR	NYS	2.3 km	MPC · JPL
108526	2001 LY_{1}	—	June 13, 2001	Socorro	LINEAR	·	1.5 km	MPC · JPL
108527	2001 LG_{2}	—	June 13, 2001	Socorro	LINEAR	·	2.6 km	MPC · JPL
108528	2001 LQ_{2}	—	June 13, 2001	Socorro	LINEAR	NYS	2.2 km	MPC · JPL
108529	2001 LV_{2}	—	June 13, 2001	Socorro	LINEAR	·	2.6 km	MPC · JPL
108530	2001 LD_{4}	—	June 13, 2001	Socorro	LINEAR	·	5.5 km	MPC · JPL
108531	2001 LH_{4}	—	June 13, 2001	Socorro	LINEAR	·	2.4 km	MPC · JPL
108532	2001 LJ_{4}	—	June 13, 2001	Socorro	LINEAR	·	4.6 km	MPC · JPL
108533	2001 LV_{4}	—	June 12, 2001	Palomar	NEAT	·	2.5 km	MPC · JPL
108534	2001 LK_{5}	—	June 15, 2001	Haleakala	NEAT	MAR	2.6 km	MPC · JPL
108535	2001 LG_{6}	—	June 12, 2001	Haleakala	NEAT	V	1.3 km	MPC · JPL
108536	2001 LN_{6}	—	June 14, 2001	Palomar	NEAT	(1118)	8.5 km	MPC · JPL
108537	2001 LY_{6}	—	June 15, 2001	Palomar	NEAT	·	2.3 km	MPC · JPL
108538	2001 LH_{7}	—	June 15, 2001	Socorro	LINEAR	·	2.7 km	MPC · JPL
108539	2001 LC_{8}	—	June 15, 2001	Palomar	NEAT	EOS	3.6 km	MPC · JPL
108540	2001 LQ_{8}	—	June 15, 2001	Palomar	NEAT	·	2.3 km	MPC · JPL
108541	2001 LS_{8}	—	June 15, 2001	Palomar	NEAT	·	9.8 km	MPC · JPL
108542	2001 LZ_{8}	—	June 15, 2001	Socorro	LINEAR	·	2.5 km	MPC · JPL
108543	2001 LL_{9}	—	June 15, 2001	Socorro	LINEAR	·	2.1 km	MPC · JPL
108544	2001 LO_{9}	—	June 15, 2001	Socorro	LINEAR	·	4.1 km	MPC · JPL
108545	2001 LZ_{9}	—	June 15, 2001	Socorro	LINEAR	·	3.6 km	MPC · JPL
108546	2001 LB_{10}	—	June 15, 2001	Socorro	LINEAR	·	4.2 km	MPC · JPL
108547	2001 LW_{10}	—	June 15, 2001	Socorro	LINEAR	CLO	3.8 km	MPC · JPL
108548	2001 LE_{11}	—	June 15, 2001	Socorro	LINEAR	·	2.5 km	MPC · JPL
108549	2001 LJ_{11}	—	June 15, 2001	Socorro	LINEAR	·	4.8 km	MPC · JPL
108550	2001 LV_{11}	—	June 15, 2001	Socorro	LINEAR	·	3.0 km	MPC · JPL
108551	2001 LK_{12}	—	June 15, 2001	Socorro	LINEAR	·	2.6 km	MPC · JPL
108552	2001 LM_{12}	—	June 15, 2001	Socorro	LINEAR	·	3.6 km	MPC · JPL
108553	2001 LS_{12}	—	June 15, 2001	Socorro	LINEAR	·	8.5 km	MPC · JPL
108554	2001 LC_{13}	—	June 15, 2001	Palomar	NEAT	HNS	3.7 km	MPC · JPL
108555	2001 LW_{13}	—	June 15, 2001	Socorro	LINEAR	·	1.9 km	MPC · JPL
108556	2001 LD_{14}	—	June 15, 2001	Socorro	LINEAR	·	2.5 km	MPC · JPL
108557	2001 LU_{14}	—	June 15, 2001	Socorro	LINEAR	·	2.7 km	MPC · JPL
108558	2001 LL_{15}	—	June 12, 2001	Anderson Mesa	LONEOS	·	4.4 km	MPC · JPL
108559	2001 LC_{16}	—	June 13, 2001	Kitt Peak	Spacewatch	·	2.2 km	MPC · JPL
108560	2001 LM_{16}	—	June 14, 2001	Kitt Peak	Spacewatch	·	3.8 km	MPC · JPL
108561	2001 LY_{16}	—	June 15, 2001	Socorro	LINEAR	·	8.1 km	MPC · JPL
108562	2001 LC_{19}	—	June 15, 2001	Socorro	LINEAR	·	2.6 km	MPC · JPL
108563	2001 LM_{19}	—	June 15, 2001	Haleakala	NEAT	·	3.9 km	MPC · JPL
108564	2001 LN_{19}	—	June 15, 2001	Palomar	NEAT	·	3.3 km	MPC · JPL
108565	2001 MC	—	June 16, 2001	Desert Beaver	W. K. Y. Yeung	3:2	11 km	MPC · JPL
108566	2001 MF	—	June 16, 2001	Desert Beaver	W. K. Y. Yeung	·	4.9 km	MPC · JPL
108567	2001 MY	—	June 18, 2001	Desert Beaver	W. K. Y. Yeung	MAS	1.3 km	MPC · JPL
108568	2001 MA_{1}	—	June 18, 2001	Reedy Creek	J. Broughton	·	2.8 km	MPC · JPL
108569	2001 MB_{1}	—	June 18, 2001	Reedy Creek	J. Broughton	·	4.1 km	MPC · JPL
108570	2001 MH_{2}	—	June 19, 2001	Socorro	LINEAR	T_{j} (2.97)	11 km	MPC · JPL
108571	2001 MX_{2}	—	June 16, 2001	Palomar	NEAT	·	3.6 km	MPC · JPL
108572	2001 MA_{4}	—	June 16, 2001	Socorro	LINEAR	·	3.6 km	MPC · JPL
108573	2001 MN_{4}	—	June 17, 2001	Palomar	NEAT	·	2.3 km	MPC · JPL
108574	2001 MR_{4}	—	June 17, 2001	Palomar	NEAT	·	2.2 km	MPC · JPL
108575	2001 MS_{5}	—	June 18, 2001	Palomar	NEAT	·	2.3 km	MPC · JPL
108576	2001 MF_{6}	—	June 21, 2001	Palomar	NEAT	·	4.3 km	MPC · JPL
108577	2001 ML_{6}	—	June 21, 2001	Palomar	NEAT	MAR	2.5 km	MPC · JPL
108578	2001 MQ_{7}	—	June 23, 2001	Palomar	NEAT	CYB	5.5 km	MPC · JPL
108579	2001 MD_{8}	—	June 20, 2001	Haleakala	NEAT	·	8.8 km	MPC · JPL
108580	2001 MJ_{8}	—	June 20, 2001	Haleakala	NEAT	·	5.8 km	MPC · JPL
108581	2001 MS_{8}	—	June 16, 2001	Haleakala	NEAT	NYS	3.0 km	MPC · JPL
108582	2001 MZ_{8}	—	June 19, 2001	Palomar	NEAT	MAS	1.5 km	MPC · JPL
108583	2001 MD_{9}	—	June 21, 2001	Palomar	NEAT	·	3.1 km	MPC · JPL
108584	2001 MQ_{9}	—	June 21, 2001	Palomar	NEAT	·	7.5 km	MPC · JPL
108585	2001 MS_{9}	—	June 22, 2001	Palomar	NEAT	V	2.1 km	MPC · JPL
108586	2001 MA_{10}	—	June 23, 2001	Palomar	NEAT	·	2.8 km	MPC · JPL
108587	2001 MC_{10}	—	June 24, 2001	Palomar	NEAT	MAR	2.6 km	MPC · JPL
108588	2001 MR_{10}	—	June 21, 2001	Palomar	NEAT	·	2.3 km	MPC · JPL
108589	2001 MF_{11}	—	June 25, 2001	Palomar	NEAT	·	3.7 km	MPC · JPL
108590	2001 MM_{12}	—	June 21, 2001	Palomar	NEAT	PHO	1.9 km	MPC · JPL
108591	2001 MW_{12}	—	June 23, 2001	Palomar	NEAT	·	2.8 km	MPC · JPL
108592	2001 MC_{13}	—	June 23, 2001	Palomar	NEAT	slow?	3.1 km	MPC · JPL
108593	2001 MV_{13}	—	June 25, 2001	Palomar	NEAT	EOS	4.0 km	MPC · JPL
108594	2001 MZ_{14}	—	June 28, 2001	Anderson Mesa	LONEOS	·	2.6 km	MPC · JPL
108595	2001 MM_{15}	—	June 25, 2001	Palomar	NEAT	·	1.8 km	MPC · JPL
108596	2001 MR_{15}	—	June 25, 2001	Palomar	NEAT	·	2.7 km	MPC · JPL
108597	2001 MJ_{16}	—	June 27, 2001	Palomar	NEAT	3:2	10 km	MPC · JPL
108598	2001 MS_{17}	—	June 27, 2001	Kitt Peak	Spacewatch	·	3.4 km	MPC · JPL
108599	2001 MY_{17}	—	June 28, 2001	Anderson Mesa	LONEOS	·	5.6 km	MPC · JPL
108600	2001 MB_{18}	—	June 29, 2001	Anderson Mesa	LONEOS	·	8.5 km	MPC · JPL

== 108601–108700 ==
back to top

Designation			Discovery			Properties		Ref
Permanent	Provisional	Named after	Date	Site	Discoverer(s)	Category	Diam.	Ref
108601	2001 ML_{18}	—	June 24, 2001	Palomar	NEAT	EUN	2.3 km	MPC · JPL
108602	2001 MA_{19}	—	June 29, 2001	Anderson Mesa	LONEOS	·	11 km	MPC · JPL
108603	2001 MG_{19}	—	June 20, 2001	Haleakala	NEAT	·	4.2 km	MPC · JPL
108604	2001 MJ_{19}	—	June 21, 2001	Palomar	NEAT	·	2.7 km	MPC · JPL
108605	2001 MZ_{19}	—	June 25, 2001	Palomar	NEAT	V	1.4 km	MPC · JPL
108606	2001 MG_{20}	—	June 25, 2001	Palomar	NEAT	·	1.3 km	MPC · JPL
108607	2001 MA_{21}	—	June 26, 2001	Palomar	NEAT	·	7.5 km	MPC · JPL
108608	2001 MC_{21}	—	June 26, 2001	Palomar	NEAT	·	1.7 km	MPC · JPL
108609	2001 MF_{21}	—	June 26, 2001	Palomar	NEAT	NYS ·	4.0 km	MPC · JPL
108610	2001 MP_{21}	—	June 27, 2001	Palomar	NEAT	EOS	5.7 km	MPC · JPL
108611	2001 MM_{23}	—	June 27, 2001	Palomar	NEAT	V	1.4 km	MPC · JPL
108612	2001 MG_{24}	—	June 28, 2001	Haleakala	NEAT	·	3.4 km	MPC · JPL
108613	2001 MH_{24}	—	June 30, 2001	Palomar	NEAT	·	2.9 km	MPC · JPL
108614	2001 ME_{25}	—	June 17, 2001	Anderson Mesa	LONEOS	EUN	3.0 km	MPC · JPL
108615	2001 MF_{25}	—	June 17, 2001	Anderson Mesa	LONEOS	·	2.2 km	MPC · JPL
108616	2001 ML_{25}	—	June 17, 2001	Anderson Mesa	LONEOS	EUN · fast?	3.3 km	MPC · JPL
108617	2001 MA_{26}	—	June 19, 2001	Haleakala	NEAT	·	4.1 km	MPC · JPL
108618	2001 MB_{26}	—	June 19, 2001	Haleakala	NEAT	·	6.0 km	MPC · JPL
108619	2001 ME_{26}	—	June 19, 2001	Haleakala	NEAT	·	4.4 km	MPC · JPL
108620	2001 MY_{26}	—	June 19, 2001	Haleakala	NEAT	·	4.6 km	MPC · JPL
108621	2001 MB_{27}	—	June 20, 2001	Anderson Mesa	LONEOS	·	4.2 km	MPC · JPL
108622	2001 MF_{27}	—	June 20, 2001	Anderson Mesa	LONEOS	·	7.5 km	MPC · JPL
108623	2001 MR_{27}	—	June 21, 2001	Socorro	LINEAR	GEF	3.2 km	MPC · JPL
108624	2001 MX_{27}	—	June 22, 2001	Palomar	NEAT	·	2.6 km	MPC · JPL
108625	2001 MM_{28}	—	June 25, 2001	Palomar	NEAT	·	2.5 km	MPC · JPL
108626	2001 MN_{28}	—	June 26, 2001	Palomar	NEAT	·	2.2 km	MPC · JPL
108627	2001 MU_{28}	—	June 27, 2001	Anderson Mesa	LONEOS	·	1.6 km	MPC · JPL
108628	2001 MZ_{28}	—	June 27, 2001	Anderson Mesa	LONEOS	·	2.8 km	MPC · JPL
108629	2001 MB_{29}	—	June 27, 2001	Anderson Mesa	LONEOS	·	2.6 km	MPC · JPL
108630	2001 MR_{29}	—	June 27, 2001	Anderson Mesa	LONEOS	·	3.3 km	MPC · JPL
108631	2001 NG	—	July 10, 2001	Palomar	NEAT	SUL	4.5 km	MPC · JPL
108632	2001 NL_{2}	—	July 13, 2001	Palomar	NEAT	·	6.1 km	MPC · JPL
108633	2001 NO_{2}	—	July 13, 2001	Palomar	NEAT	·	5.4 km	MPC · JPL
108634	2001 NU_{2}	—	July 13, 2001	Palomar	NEAT	GEF	3.2 km	MPC · JPL
108635	2001 NJ_{3}	—	July 13, 2001	Palomar	NEAT	MAS	1.2 km	MPC · JPL
108636	2001 NS_{3}	—	July 13, 2001	Palomar	NEAT	·	4.8 km	MPC · JPL
108637	2001 NE_{4}	—	July 13, 2001	Palomar	NEAT	·	2.6 km	MPC · JPL
108638	2001 NZ_{5}	—	July 13, 2001	Haleakala	NEAT	·	8.6 km	MPC · JPL
108639	2001 NW_{7}	—	July 14, 2001	Palomar	NEAT	·	3.0 km	MPC · JPL
108640	2001 NZ_{8}	—	July 12, 2001	Palomar	NEAT	·	6.8 km	MPC · JPL
108641	2001 NU_{9}	—	July 15, 2001	Ondřejov	L. Kotková	·	3.8 km	MPC · JPL
108642	2001 NY_{9}	—	July 13, 2001	Palomar	NEAT	·	4.0 km	MPC · JPL
108643	2001 NP_{10}	—	July 14, 2001	Haleakala	NEAT	·	2.3 km	MPC · JPL
108644	2001 NT_{10}	—	July 14, 2001	Haleakala	NEAT	EUN	2.7 km	MPC · JPL
108645	2001 NS_{11}	—	July 12, 2001	Palomar	NEAT	V	1.2 km	MPC · JPL
108646	2001 NZ_{11}	—	July 13, 2001	Palomar	NEAT	·	4.3 km	MPC · JPL
108647	2001 NA_{13}	—	July 14, 2001	Haleakala	NEAT	·	1.9 km	MPC · JPL
108648	2001 NN_{15}	—	July 13, 2001	Palomar	NEAT	·	5.5 km	MPC · JPL
108649	2001 NT_{15}	—	July 13, 2001	Palomar	NEAT	·	5.5 km	MPC · JPL
108650	2001 NX_{15}	—	July 14, 2001	Palomar	NEAT	·	4.6 km	MPC · JPL
108651	2001 NH_{16}	—	July 14, 2001	Palomar	NEAT	·	1.7 km	MPC · JPL
108652	2001 NR_{16}	—	July 14, 2001	Palomar	NEAT	AGN	2.6 km	MPC · JPL
108653	2001 ND_{18}	—	July 9, 2001	Socorro	LINEAR	ADE	6.0 km	MPC · JPL
108654	2001 NK_{19}	—	July 14, 2001	Palomar	NEAT	PHO	1.9 km	MPC · JPL
108655	2001 NV_{19}	—	July 12, 2001	Haleakala	NEAT	·	4.6 km	MPC · JPL
108656	2001 NW_{19}	—	July 12, 2001	Haleakala	NEAT	PHO	4.0 km	MPC · JPL
108657	2001 NC_{20}	—	July 12, 2001	Palomar	NEAT	·	2.5 km	MPC · JPL
108658	2001 ND_{20}	—	July 12, 2001	Palomar	NEAT	(194)	5.8 km	MPC · JPL
108659	2001 NF_{20}	—	July 13, 2001	Palomar	NEAT	·	2.5 km	MPC · JPL
108660	2001 NM_{20}	—	July 13, 2001	Palomar	NEAT	·	12 km	MPC · JPL
108661	2001 NP_{20}	—	July 14, 2001	Palomar	NEAT	CYB	8.7 km	MPC · JPL
108662	2001 NY_{20}	—	July 14, 2001	Palomar	NEAT	fast	3.1 km	MPC · JPL
108663	2001 NE_{21}	—	July 14, 2001	Palomar	NEAT	·	1.5 km	MPC · JPL
108664	2001 NT_{21}	—	July 14, 2001	Palomar	NEAT	·	2.0 km	MPC · JPL
108665	2001 NB_{22}	—	July 14, 2001	Palomar	NEAT	NYS	3.1 km	MPC · JPL
108666	2001 OD	—	July 16, 2001	Anderson Mesa	LONEOS	·	3.6 km	MPC · JPL
108667	2001 OS	—	July 17, 2001	Palomar	NEAT	·	3.3 km	MPC · JPL
108668	2001 OX_{1}	—	July 18, 2001	Palomar	NEAT	·	5.7 km	MPC · JPL
108669	2001 OM_{2}	—	July 17, 2001	Anderson Mesa	LONEOS	·	5.5 km	MPC · JPL
108670	2001 OS_{2}	—	July 19, 2001	Palomar	NEAT	·	8.0 km	MPC · JPL
108671	2001 OW_{2}	—	July 19, 2001	Desert Beaver	W. K. Y. Yeung	TIR	7.7 km	MPC · JPL
108672	2001 OA_{4}	—	July 18, 2001	Palomar	NEAT	·	4.1 km	MPC · JPL
108673	2001 OT_{4}	—	July 16, 2001	Anderson Mesa	LONEOS	·	2.7 km	MPC · JPL
108674	2001 OU_{4}	—	July 16, 2001	Anderson Mesa	LONEOS	·	3.9 km	MPC · JPL
108675	2001 OZ_{4}	—	July 17, 2001	Anderson Mesa	LONEOS	·	2.7 km	MPC · JPL
108676	2001 OQ_{5}	—	July 17, 2001	Anderson Mesa	LONEOS	·	6.7 km	MPC · JPL
108677	2001 OV_{5}	—	July 17, 2001	Anderson Mesa	LONEOS	·	9.2 km	MPC · JPL
108678	2001 OA_{6}	—	July 17, 2001	Anderson Mesa	LONEOS	·	6.5 km	MPC · JPL
108679	2001 OF_{6}	—	July 17, 2001	Anderson Mesa	LONEOS	MAR	2.5 km	MPC · JPL
108680	2001 OS_{6}	—	July 17, 2001	Anderson Mesa	LONEOS	·	2.6 km	MPC · JPL
108681	2001 OF_{7}	—	July 17, 2001	Anderson Mesa	LONEOS	·	2.5 km	MPC · JPL
108682	2001 OQ_{7}	—	July 17, 2001	Anderson Mesa	LONEOS	·	4.2 km	MPC · JPL
108683	2001 OU_{7}	—	July 17, 2001	Anderson Mesa	LONEOS	DOR	4.9 km	MPC · JPL
108684	2001 OX_{7}	—	July 17, 2001	Anderson Mesa	LONEOS	·	4.7 km	MPC · JPL
108685	2001 OH_{8}	—	July 17, 2001	Anderson Mesa	LONEOS	·	1.7 km	MPC · JPL
108686	2001 OK_{8}	—	July 17, 2001	Anderson Mesa	LONEOS	PHO	2.0 km	MPC · JPL
108687	2001 OU_{8}	—	July 17, 2001	Anderson Mesa	LONEOS	EUN	2.6 km	MPC · JPL
108688	2001 OA_{9}	—	July 20, 2001	Anderson Mesa	LONEOS	V	1.4 km	MPC · JPL
108689	2001 OS_{9}	—	July 17, 2001	Haleakala	NEAT	·	4.3 km	MPC · JPL
108690	2001 OZ_{9}	—	July 19, 2001	Palomar	NEAT	·	2.3 km	MPC · JPL
108691	2001 OY_{10}	—	July 20, 2001	Palomar	NEAT	·	3.1 km	MPC · JPL
108692	2001 OO_{11}	—	July 18, 2001	Palomar	NEAT	PHO	1.9 km	MPC · JPL
108693	2001 OA_{12}	—	July 19, 2001	Palomar	NEAT	·	3.8 km	MPC · JPL
108694	2001 OB_{12}	—	July 20, 2001	Palomar	NEAT	·	3.9 km	MPC · JPL
108695	2001 OH_{12}	—	July 20, 2001	Palomar	NEAT	·	4.5 km	MPC · JPL
108696	2001 OF_{13}	—	July 21, 2001	Anderson Mesa	LONEOS	·	3.6 km	MPC · JPL
108697	2001 ON_{13}	—	July 20, 2001	Socorro	LINEAR	·	2.1 km	MPC · JPL
108698	2001 OP_{13}	—	July 20, 2001	Socorro	LINEAR	·	6.3 km	MPC · JPL
108699	2001 OB_{15}	—	July 18, 2001	Palomar	NEAT	·	7.8 km	MPC · JPL
108700	2001 OL_{15}	—	July 18, 2001	Palomar	NEAT	·	2.5 km	MPC · JPL

== 108701–108800 ==
back to top

Designation			Discovery			Properties		Ref
Permanent	Provisional	Named after	Date	Site	Discoverer(s)	Category	Diam.	Ref
108701	2001 OF_{16}	—	July 21, 2001	Palomar	NEAT	·	7.6 km	MPC · JPL
108702 Michelefoparri	2001 OX_{16}	Michelefoparri	July 21, 2001	San Marcello	M. Tombelli, G. Forti	EMA	7.9 km	MPC · JPL
108703	2001 OU_{17}	—	July 17, 2001	Haleakala	NEAT	·	3.0 km	MPC · JPL
108704	2001 OW_{17}	—	July 17, 2001	Haleakala	NEAT	·	2.3 km	MPC · JPL
108705	2001 OO_{18}	—	July 17, 2001	Haleakala	NEAT	·	5.4 km	MPC · JPL
108706	2001 OX_{18}	—	July 17, 2001	Haleakala	NEAT	·	4.9 km	MPC · JPL
108707	2001 OW_{19}	—	July 19, 2001	Palomar	NEAT	·	5.9 km	MPC · JPL
108708	2001 OH_{20}	—	July 21, 2001	Anderson Mesa	LONEOS	·	8.4 km	MPC · JPL
108709	2001 OK_{20}	—	July 21, 2001	Anderson Mesa	LONEOS	MAR ·	2.1 km	MPC · JPL
108710	2001 OP_{20}	—	July 21, 2001	Anderson Mesa	LONEOS	·	2.2 km	MPC · JPL
108711	2001 OE_{22}	—	July 21, 2001	Anderson Mesa	LONEOS	·	2.9 km	MPC · JPL
108712	2001 OF_{22}	—	July 21, 2001	Anderson Mesa	LONEOS	·	7.5 km	MPC · JPL
108713	2001 OM_{22}	—	July 17, 2001	Palomar	NEAT	PHO	4.3 km	MPC · JPL
108714	2001 OV_{22}	—	July 18, 2001	Palomar	NEAT	EOS	4.7 km	MPC · JPL
108715	2001 OA_{23}	—	July 19, 2001	Palomar	NEAT	EUP	8.8 km	MPC · JPL
108716	2001 OD_{23}	—	July 21, 2001	Palomar	NEAT	·	2.7 km	MPC · JPL
108717	2001 OJ_{23}	—	July 22, 2001	Palomar	NEAT	·	3.0 km	MPC · JPL
108718	2001 ON_{23}	—	July 22, 2001	Palomar	NEAT	·	2.4 km	MPC · JPL
108719	2001 OQ_{23}	—	July 22, 2001	Palomar	NEAT	·	5.3 km	MPC · JPL
108720 Kamikuroiwa	2001 OT_{23}	Kamikuroiwa	July 22, 2001	Kuma Kogen	A. Nakamura	·	5.2 km	MPC · JPL
108721	2001 OZ_{23}	—	July 16, 2001	Anderson Mesa	LONEOS	·	6.4 km	MPC · JPL
108722	2001 OL_{24}	—	July 16, 2001	Anderson Mesa	LONEOS	·	1.9 km	MPC · JPL
108723	2001 OM_{24}	—	July 16, 2001	Anderson Mesa	LONEOS	·	2.5 km	MPC · JPL
108724	2001 OS_{24}	—	July 16, 2001	Anderson Mesa	LONEOS	·	5.3 km	MPC · JPL
108725	2001 OV_{25}	—	July 18, 2001	Haleakala	NEAT	·	1.7 km	MPC · JPL
108726	2001 OC_{26}	—	July 19, 2001	Haleakala	NEAT	NYS	2.3 km	MPC · JPL
108727	2001 OX_{27}	—	July 18, 2001	Palomar	NEAT	·	9.5 km	MPC · JPL
108728	2001 OH_{28}	—	July 18, 2001	Palomar	NEAT	·	2.8 km	MPC · JPL
108729	2001 ON_{28}	—	July 18, 2001	Palomar	NEAT	·	3.3 km	MPC · JPL
108730	2001 OB_{30}	—	July 19, 2001	Palomar	NEAT	·	7.1 km	MPC · JPL
108731	2001 OB_{31}	—	July 19, 2001	Palomar	NEAT	·	3.4 km	MPC · JPL
108732	2001 OF_{31}	—	July 19, 2001	Palomar	NEAT	·	2.8 km	MPC · JPL
108733	2001 OH_{31}	—	July 19, 2001	Palomar	NEAT	·	2.1 km	MPC · JPL
108734	2001 OD_{32}	—	July 23, 2001	Reedy Creek	J. Broughton	·	7.3 km	MPC · JPL
108735	2001 OE_{32}	—	July 24, 2001	McDonald	Ries, J. G.	·	3.2 km	MPC · JPL
108736	2001 OG_{32}	—	July 24, 2001	Lake Tekapo	I. P. Griffin, Brady, N.	·	1.3 km	MPC · JPL
108737	2001 OP_{34}	—	July 19, 2001	Palomar	NEAT	·	2.4 km	MPC · JPL
108738	2001 OR_{34}	—	July 19, 2001	Palomar	NEAT	·	2.2 km	MPC · JPL
108739	2001 OO_{35}	—	July 20, 2001	Palomar	NEAT	·	4.0 km	MPC · JPL
108740	2001 OU_{38}	—	July 20, 2001	Palomar	NEAT	·	4.7 km	MPC · JPL
108741	2001 OQ_{39}	—	July 20, 2001	Palomar	NEAT	·	2.5 km	MPC · JPL
108742	2001 OX_{39}	—	July 20, 2001	Palomar	NEAT	·	2.3 km	MPC · JPL
108743	2001 OG_{40}	—	July 20, 2001	Palomar	NEAT	·	4.7 km	MPC · JPL
108744	2001 OM_{40}	—	July 20, 2001	Palomar	NEAT	·	5.2 km	MPC · JPL
108745	2001 ON_{40}	—	July 20, 2001	Palomar	NEAT	·	3.9 km	MPC · JPL
108746	2001 OZ_{40}	—	July 21, 2001	Palomar	NEAT	·	2.2 km	MPC · JPL
108747	2001 OB_{42}	—	July 22, 2001	Palomar	NEAT	·	2.4 km	MPC · JPL
108748	2001 OJ_{42}	—	July 22, 2001	Palomar	NEAT	·	4.8 km	MPC · JPL
108749	2001 OK_{42}	—	July 22, 2001	Palomar	NEAT	·	2.6 km	MPC · JPL
108750	2001 OC_{43}	—	July 22, 2001	Palomar	NEAT	·	5.3 km	MPC · JPL
108751	2001 OE_{43}	—	July 22, 2001	Palomar	NEAT	·	4.5 km	MPC · JPL
108752	2001 OF_{43}	—	July 22, 2001	Palomar	NEAT	EOS	4.1 km	MPC · JPL
108753	2001 OV_{43}	—	July 23, 2001	Palomar	NEAT	NEM	5.3 km	MPC · JPL
108754	2001 OM_{44}	—	July 23, 2001	Palomar	NEAT	·	2.6 km	MPC · JPL
108755	2001 OP_{44}	—	July 23, 2001	Palomar	NEAT	EMA	7.3 km	MPC · JPL
108756	2001 OR_{44}	—	July 23, 2001	Haleakala	NEAT	NYS	2.1 km	MPC · JPL
108757	2001 OK_{45}	—	July 16, 2001	Anderson Mesa	LONEOS	·	3.2 km	MPC · JPL
108758	2001 OB_{46}	—	July 16, 2001	Anderson Mesa	LONEOS	MAS	2.9 km	MPC · JPL
108759	2001 OG_{46}	—	July 16, 2001	Anderson Mesa	LONEOS	·	7.5 km	MPC · JPL
108760	2001 OJ_{46}	—	July 16, 2001	Anderson Mesa	LONEOS	(5)	2.7 km	MPC · JPL
108761	2001 OK_{46}	—	July 16, 2001	Anderson Mesa	LONEOS	NYS	2.3 km	MPC · JPL
108762	2001 ON_{46}	—	July 16, 2001	Anderson Mesa	LONEOS	·	2.3 km	MPC · JPL
108763	2001 OQ_{46}	—	July 16, 2001	Anderson Mesa	LONEOS	·	8.2 km	MPC · JPL
108764	2001 OZ_{47}	—	July 16, 2001	Haleakala	NEAT	·	3.9 km	MPC · JPL
108765	2001 OB_{48}	—	July 16, 2001	Haleakala	NEAT	·	8.7 km	MPC · JPL
108766	2001 OJ_{48}	—	July 16, 2001	Haleakala	NEAT	PHO	1.9 km	MPC · JPL
108767	2001 OG_{49}	—	July 17, 2001	Anderson Mesa	LONEOS	V	1.3 km	MPC · JPL
108768	2001 OT_{50}	—	July 20, 2001	Palomar	NEAT	·	3.7 km	MPC · JPL
108769	2001 OG_{51}	—	July 21, 2001	Palomar	NEAT	NYS	2.0 km	MPC · JPL
108770	2001 OV_{51}	—	July 21, 2001	Palomar	NEAT	·	3.8 km	MPC · JPL
108771	2001 OC_{52}	—	July 21, 2001	Palomar	NEAT	·	4.3 km	MPC · JPL
108772	2001 OA_{53}	—	July 21, 2001	Palomar	NEAT	·	2.5 km	MPC · JPL
108773	2001 OD_{53}	—	July 21, 2001	Palomar	NEAT	·	7.3 km	MPC · JPL
108774	2001 OV_{53}	—	July 21, 2001	Palomar	NEAT	·	5.9 km	MPC · JPL
108775	2001 OB_{54}	—	July 21, 2001	Palomar	NEAT	·	6.7 km	MPC · JPL
108776	2001 OE_{54}	—	July 21, 2001	Palomar	NEAT	·	3.1 km	MPC · JPL
108777	2001 OQ_{54}	—	July 22, 2001	Palomar	NEAT	AEG	7.4 km	MPC · JPL
108778	2001 OX_{54}	—	July 22, 2001	Palomar	NEAT	·	5.9 km	MPC · JPL
108779	2001 OX_{55}	—	July 22, 2001	Palomar	NEAT	·	2.8 km	MPC · JPL
108780	2001 OT_{58}	—	July 20, 2001	Palomar	NEAT	·	3.7 km	MPC · JPL
108781	2001 OU_{58}	—	July 20, 2001	Palomar	NEAT	·	4.4 km	MPC · JPL
108782	2001 OR_{60}	—	July 21, 2001	Haleakala	NEAT	·	2.1 km	MPC · JPL
108783	2001 OT_{62}	—	July 20, 2001	Anderson Mesa	LONEOS	·	6.0 km	MPC · JPL
108784	2001 OV_{62}	—	July 20, 2001	Anderson Mesa	LONEOS	·	6.8 km	MPC · JPL
108785	2001 OD_{63}	—	July 26, 2001	Desert Beaver	W. K. Y. Yeung	(5)	2.2 km	MPC · JPL
108786	2001 OH_{63}	—	July 26, 2001	Desert Beaver	W. K. Y. Yeung	·	5.0 km	MPC · JPL
108787	2001 OM_{63}	—	July 19, 2001	Haleakala	NEAT	·	8.4 km	MPC · JPL
108788	2001 OG_{64}	—	July 24, 2001	Haleakala	NEAT	EOS	3.3 km	MPC · JPL
108789	2001 OD_{65}	—	July 22, 2001	Palomar	NEAT	·	4.4 km	MPC · JPL
108790	2001 OT_{65}	—	July 28, 2001	Reedy Creek	J. Broughton	·	2.8 km	MPC · JPL
108791	2001 OX_{65}	—	July 22, 2001	Socorro	LINEAR	·	2.4 km	MPC · JPL
108792	2001 OZ_{65}	—	July 22, 2001	Socorro	LINEAR	·	3.0 km	MPC · JPL
108793	2001 OJ_{66}	—	July 22, 2001	Palomar	NEAT	·	1.9 km	MPC · JPL
108794	2001 OL_{67}	—	July 27, 2001	Palomar	NEAT	(7744)	2.5 km	MPC · JPL
108795	2001 OY_{67}	—	July 16, 2001	Anderson Mesa	LONEOS	NYS	1.9 km	MPC · JPL
108796	2001 OM_{68}	—	July 16, 2001	Anderson Mesa	LONEOS	·	3.2 km	MPC · JPL
108797	2001 OV_{69}	—	July 19, 2001	Anderson Mesa	LONEOS	·	2.4 km	MPC · JPL
108798	2001 OF_{70}	—	July 19, 2001	Anderson Mesa	LONEOS	·	2.7 km	MPC · JPL
108799	2001 OX_{70}	—	July 19, 2001	Palomar	NEAT	·	3.6 km	MPC · JPL
108800	2001 OR_{71}	—	July 21, 2001	Kitt Peak	Spacewatch	·	4.4 km	MPC · JPL

== 108801–108900 ==
back to top

Designation			Discovery			Properties		Ref
Permanent	Provisional	Named after	Date	Site	Discoverer(s)	Category	Diam.	Ref
108801	2001 OV_{71}	—	July 21, 2001	Haleakala	NEAT	·	3.3 km	MPC · JPL
108802	2001 OB_{72}	—	July 21, 2001	Anderson Mesa	LONEOS	·	4.7 km	MPC · JPL
108803	2001 OX_{72}	—	July 21, 2001	Anderson Mesa	LONEOS	(5)	3.4 km	MPC · JPL
108804	2001 OP_{73}	—	July 21, 2001	Kitt Peak	Spacewatch	EUN	2.6 km	MPC · JPL
108805	2001 OT_{73}	—	July 21, 2001	Kitt Peak	Spacewatch	·	2.7 km	MPC · JPL
108806	2001 OK_{74}	—	July 19, 2001	Palomar	NEAT	·	7.0 km	MPC · JPL
108807	2001 ON_{74}	—	July 29, 2001	Reedy Creek	J. Broughton	·	5.1 km	MPC · JPL
108808	2001 OR_{74}	—	July 29, 2001	Socorro	LINEAR	·	5.1 km	MPC · JPL
108809	2001 OU_{74}	—	July 29, 2001	Socorro	LINEAR	TIR	6.1 km	MPC · JPL
108810	2001 OV_{74}	—	July 29, 2001	Socorro	LINEAR	·	3.0 km	MPC · JPL
108811	2001 OA_{75}	—	July 29, 2001	Socorro	LINEAR	·	3.2 km	MPC · JPL
108812	2001 OG_{75}	—	July 24, 2001	Palomar	NEAT	·	5.9 km	MPC · JPL
108813	2001 OH_{75}	—	July 24, 2001	Palomar	NEAT	·	2.6 km	MPC · JPL
108814	2001 OU_{75}	—	July 25, 2001	Palomar	NEAT	·	6.6 km	MPC · JPL
108815	2001 OD_{76}	—	July 29, 2001	Palomar	NEAT	·	5.7 km	MPC · JPL
108816	2001 OL_{76}	—	July 22, 2001	Palomar	NEAT	·	5.7 km	MPC · JPL
108817	2001 OS_{76}	—	July 23, 2001	Haleakala	NEAT	·	6.9 km	MPC · JPL
108818	2001 OM_{77}	—	July 26, 2001	Palomar	NEAT	·	2.8 km	MPC · JPL
108819	2001 OW_{77}	—	July 26, 2001	Palomar	NEAT	V	1.4 km	MPC · JPL
108820	2001 OX_{77}	—	July 26, 2001	Palomar	NEAT	·	2.2 km	MPC · JPL
108821	2001 OT_{78}	—	July 26, 2001	Palomar	NEAT	·	4.5 km	MPC · JPL
108822	2001 OX_{78}	—	July 26, 2001	Palomar	NEAT	·	6.2 km	MPC · JPL
108823	2001 OD_{79}	—	July 26, 2001	Palomar	NEAT	WIT	2.3 km	MPC · JPL
108824	2001 OG_{79}	—	July 27, 2001	Palomar	NEAT	·	2.4 km	MPC · JPL
108825	2001 OQ_{79}	—	July 27, 2001	Palomar	NEAT	·	2.7 km	MPC · JPL
108826	2001 OG_{80}	—	July 29, 2001	Palomar	NEAT	NYS ·	1.9 km	MPC · JPL
108827	2001 OH_{80}	—	July 29, 2001	Palomar	NEAT	·	2.3 km	MPC · JPL
108828	2001 OU_{81}	—	July 26, 2001	Haleakala	NEAT	·	3.2 km	MPC · JPL
108829	2001 OC_{82}	—	July 26, 2001	Haleakala	NEAT	·	2.6 km	MPC · JPL
108830	2001 OE_{82}	—	July 31, 2001	Palomar	NEAT	·	4.2 km	MPC · JPL
108831	2001 OT_{82}	—	July 27, 2001	Palomar	NEAT	NYS	3.5 km	MPC · JPL
108832	2001 OX_{83}	—	July 28, 2001	Haleakala	NEAT	·	2.3 km	MPC · JPL
108833	2001 OO_{84}	—	July 18, 2001	Kitt Peak	Spacewatch	NEM	3.7 km	MPC · JPL
108834	2001 OU_{84}	—	July 19, 2001	Kitt Peak	Spacewatch	EUN	1.8 km	MPC · JPL
108835	2001 OW_{84}	—	July 19, 2001	Anderson Mesa	LONEOS	V	1.5 km	MPC · JPL
108836	2001 OE_{86}	—	July 22, 2001	Socorro	LINEAR	·	2.4 km	MPC · JPL
108837	2001 OG_{86}	—	July 22, 2001	Socorro	LINEAR	·	2.5 km	MPC · JPL
108838	2001 OZ_{87}	—	July 31, 2001	Palomar	NEAT	·	2.3 km	MPC · JPL
108839	2001 OB_{88}	—	July 31, 2001	Palomar	NEAT	·	8.7 km	MPC · JPL
108840	2001 OJ_{89}	—	July 22, 2001	Socorro	LINEAR	·	2.5 km	MPC · JPL
108841	2001 OR_{89}	—	July 23, 2001	Haleakala	NEAT	PHO	3.2 km	MPC · JPL
108842	2001 OS_{89}	—	July 23, 2001	Haleakala	NEAT	V	1.2 km	MPC · JPL
108843	2001 OE_{90}	—	July 23, 2001	Haleakala	NEAT	·	2.4 km	MPC · JPL
108844	2001 OA_{91}	—	July 25, 2001	Haleakala	NEAT	·	3.6 km	MPC · JPL
108845	2001 OL_{91}	—	July 30, 2001	Palomar	NEAT	·	3.6 km	MPC · JPL
108846	2001 OW_{91}	—	July 31, 2001	Palomar	NEAT	·	6.7 km	MPC · JPL
108847	2001 OB_{92}	—	July 22, 2001	Palomar	NEAT	·	6.0 km	MPC · JPL
108848	2001 OF_{92}	—	July 22, 2001	Palomar	NEAT	·	3.6 km	MPC · JPL
108849	2001 OM_{92}	—	July 22, 2001	Palomar	NEAT	·	2.4 km	MPC · JPL
108850	2001 OU_{92}	—	July 22, 2001	Palomar	NEAT	·	2.7 km	MPC · JPL
108851	2001 OF_{94}	—	July 27, 2001	Anderson Mesa	LONEOS	·	2.1 km	MPC · JPL
108852	2001 OJ_{94}	—	July 27, 2001	Anderson Mesa	LONEOS	KOR	2.7 km	MPC · JPL
108853	2001 OL_{94}	—	July 27, 2001	Anderson Mesa	LONEOS	·	1.9 km	MPC · JPL
108854	2001 OQ_{94}	—	July 27, 2001	Anderson Mesa	LONEOS	MAS	1.5 km	MPC · JPL
108855	2001 OU_{94}	—	July 27, 2001	Anderson Mesa	LONEOS	·	3.1 km	MPC · JPL
108856	2001 OT_{95}	—	July 25, 2001	Bergisch Gladbach	W. Bickel	·	5.1 km	MPC · JPL
108857	2001 OV_{95}	—	July 25, 2001	Bergisch Gladbach	W. Bickel	·	2.8 km	MPC · JPL
108858	2001 OJ_{96}	—	July 23, 2001	Haleakala	NEAT	·	3.0 km	MPC · JPL
108859	2001 OU_{96}	—	July 25, 2001	Haleakala	NEAT	CLA	3.9 km	MPC · JPL
108860	2001 OZ_{96}	—	July 25, 2001	Haleakala	NEAT	·	2.7 km	MPC · JPL
108861	2001 OD_{97}	—	July 25, 2001	Haleakala	NEAT	HYG	8.4 km	MPC · JPL
108862	2001 OQ_{97}	—	July 25, 2001	Haleakala	NEAT	·	1.8 km	MPC · JPL
108863	2001 OR_{98}	—	July 26, 2001	Palomar	NEAT	·	2.6 km	MPC · JPL
108864	2001 OS_{98}	—	July 26, 2001	Palomar	NEAT	·	2.6 km	MPC · JPL
108865	2001 OZ_{98}	—	July 27, 2001	Anderson Mesa	LONEOS	MAS ·	2.6 km	MPC · JPL
108866	2001 OO_{99}	—	July 27, 2001	Anderson Mesa	LONEOS	·	2.6 km	MPC · JPL
108867	2001 OH_{100}	—	July 27, 2001	Anderson Mesa	LONEOS	EOS	3.6 km	MPC · JPL
108868	2001 OK_{100}	—	July 27, 2001	Anderson Mesa	LONEOS	MRX	2.3 km	MPC · JPL
108869	2001 OA_{102}	—	July 28, 2001	Anderson Mesa	LONEOS	·	4.1 km	MPC · JPL
108870	2001 OQ_{102}	—	July 28, 2001	Haleakala	NEAT	·	2.8 km	MPC · JPL
108871	2001 OR_{102}	—	July 28, 2001	Haleakala	NEAT	EUN	4.2 km	MPC · JPL
108872	2001 OE_{103}	—	July 29, 2001	Anderson Mesa	LONEOS	·	6.4 km	MPC · JPL
108873	2001 OF_{103}	—	July 29, 2001	Socorro	LINEAR	·	4.0 km	MPC · JPL
108874	2001 OD_{104}	—	July 30, 2001	Socorro	LINEAR	·	3.0 km	MPC · JPL
108875	2001 OT_{104}	—	July 28, 2001	Anderson Mesa	LONEOS	EUN	3.1 km	MPC · JPL
108876	2001 OV_{104}	—	July 28, 2001	Anderson Mesa	LONEOS	·	3.4 km	MPC · JPL
108877	2001 OK_{105}	—	July 29, 2001	Anderson Mesa	LONEOS	slow	5.0 km	MPC · JPL
108878	2001 OX_{105}	—	July 29, 2001	Socorro	LINEAR	·	2.7 km	MPC · JPL
108879	2001 OB_{106}	—	July 29, 2001	Anderson Mesa	LONEOS	·	3.3 km	MPC · JPL
108880	2001 OC_{106}	—	July 29, 2001	Anderson Mesa	LONEOS	MAR	2.4 km	MPC · JPL
108881	2001 OD_{106}	—	July 29, 2001	Socorro	LINEAR	EUN	2.5 km	MPC · JPL
108882	2001 OF_{106}	—	July 29, 2001	Socorro	LINEAR	TIR	7.9 km	MPC · JPL
108883	2001 OG_{106}	—	July 29, 2001	Socorro	LINEAR	·	3.9 km	MPC · JPL
108884	2001 ON_{106}	—	July 29, 2001	Socorro	LINEAR	·	2.7 km	MPC · JPL
108885	2001 OD_{107}	—	July 29, 2001	Socorro	LINEAR	EUN	3.2 km	MPC · JPL
108886	2001 OL_{107}	—	July 29, 2001	Socorro	LINEAR	(5)	3.0 km	MPC · JPL
108887	2001 OU_{110}	—	July 27, 2001	Haleakala	NEAT	·	2.3 km	MPC · JPL
108888	2001 OQ_{111}	—	July 27, 2001	Anderson Mesa	LONEOS	·	2.6 km	MPC · JPL
108889	2001 PX	—	August 2, 2001	Haleakala	NEAT	·	6.3 km	MPC · JPL
108890	2001 PR_{1}	—	August 8, 2001	Palomar	NEAT	NYS	2.0 km	MPC · JPL
108891	2001 PH_{2}	—	August 3, 2001	Haleakala	NEAT	V	1.3 km	MPC · JPL
108892	2001 PM_{2}	—	August 3, 2001	Haleakala	NEAT	slow	5.4 km	MPC · JPL
108893	2001 PV_{2}	—	August 3, 2001	Haleakala	NEAT	·	7.2 km	MPC · JPL
108894	2001 PC_{3}	—	August 3, 2001	Haleakala	NEAT	EUN	2.9 km	MPC · JPL
108895	2001 PF_{3}	—	August 3, 2001	Haleakala	NEAT	PHO	3.2 km	MPC · JPL
108896	2001 PT_{3}	—	August 9, 2001	Palomar	NEAT	·	3.8 km	MPC · JPL
108897	2001 PW_{4}	—	August 6, 2001	Haleakala	NEAT	NYS	1.8 km	MPC · JPL
108898	2001 PX_{4}	—	August 6, 2001	Haleakala	NEAT	·	8.1 km	MPC · JPL
108899	2001 PP_{5}	—	August 10, 2001	Palomar	NEAT	·	3.7 km	MPC · JPL
108900	2001 PU_{5}	—	August 10, 2001	Haleakala	NEAT	(5)	3.3 km	MPC · JPL

== 108901–109000 ==
back to top

Designation			Discovery			Properties		Ref
Permanent	Provisional	Named after	Date	Site	Discoverer(s)	Category	Diam.	Ref
108901	2001 PP_{6}	—	August 10, 2001	Haleakala	NEAT	(5)	1.9 km	MPC · JPL
108902	2001 PR_{6}	—	August 10, 2001	Haleakala	NEAT	3:2	9.3 km	MPC · JPL
108903	2001 PR_{8}	—	August 11, 2001	Haleakala	NEAT	fast	7.0 km	MPC · JPL
108904	2001 PC_{9}	—	August 11, 2001	Haleakala	NEAT	·	6.5 km	MPC · JPL
108905	2001 PE_{9}	—	August 11, 2001	Haleakala	NEAT	·	5.4 km	MPC · JPL
108906	2001 PL_{9}	—	August 11, 2001	Palomar	NEAT	APO +1km	930 m	MPC · JPL
108907	2001 PC_{10}	—	August 8, 2001	Haleakala	NEAT	·	1.7 km	MPC · JPL
108908	2001 PM_{10}	—	August 8, 2001	Haleakala	NEAT	·	2.0 km	MPC · JPL
108909	2001 PQ_{10}	—	August 8, 2001	Haleakala	NEAT	·	2.4 km	MPC · JPL
108910	2001 PY_{10}	—	August 8, 2001	Haleakala	NEAT	·	6.6 km	MPC · JPL
108911	2001 PW_{11}	—	August 11, 2001	Palomar	NEAT	·	4.0 km	MPC · JPL
108912	2001 PD_{12}	—	August 11, 2001	Haleakala	NEAT	EOS	5.3 km	MPC · JPL
108913	2001 PQ_{12}	—	August 12, 2001	Palomar	NEAT	MAR	2.6 km	MPC · JPL
108914	2001 PR_{12}	—	August 12, 2001	Palomar	NEAT	EOS	4.3 km	MPC · JPL
108915	2001 PY_{12}	—	August 7, 2001	Haleakala	NEAT	·	2.2 km	MPC · JPL
108916	2001 PN_{13}	—	August 8, 2001	Haleakala	NEAT	·	5.3 km	MPC · JPL
108917	2001 PX_{14}	—	August 15, 2001	Emerald Lane	L. Ball	·	2.5 km	MPC · JPL
108918	2001 PZ_{14}	—	August 13, 2001	Kvistaberg	Uppsala-DLR Asteroid Survey	·	5.9 km	MPC · JPL
108919	2001 PG_{15}	—	August 8, 2001	Haleakala	NEAT	NYS	2.5 km	MPC · JPL
108920	2001 PU_{15}	—	August 9, 2001	Palomar	NEAT	GEF	2.9 km	MPC · JPL
108921	2001 PY_{15}	—	August 9, 2001	Palomar	NEAT	(5)	2.8 km	MPC · JPL
108922	2001 PU_{16}	—	August 9, 2001	Palomar	NEAT	·	7.1 km	MPC · JPL
108923	2001 PO_{18}	—	August 9, 2001	Palomar	NEAT	V	1.4 km	MPC · JPL
108924	2001 PO_{19}	—	August 10, 2001	Palomar	NEAT	·	4.2 km	MPC · JPL
108925	2001 PD_{21}	—	August 10, 2001	Haleakala	NEAT	(5)	2.5 km	MPC · JPL
108926	2001 PF_{21}	—	August 10, 2001	Haleakala	NEAT	TEL	2.8 km	MPC · JPL
108927	2001 PK_{21}	—	August 10, 2001	Haleakala	NEAT	·	4.6 km	MPC · JPL
108928	2001 PD_{22}	—	August 10, 2001	Haleakala	NEAT	·	8.1 km	MPC · JPL
108929	2001 PL_{22}	—	August 10, 2001	Haleakala	NEAT	(21885)	7.8 km	MPC · JPL
108930	2001 PQ_{22}	—	August 10, 2001	Haleakala	NEAT	·	2.4 km	MPC · JPL
108931	2001 PR_{22}	—	August 10, 2001	Haleakala	NEAT	·	2.2 km	MPC · JPL
108932	2001 PA_{23}	—	August 10, 2001	Haleakala	NEAT	URS · slow	5.4 km	MPC · JPL
108933	2001 PD_{23}	—	August 10, 2001	Haleakala	NEAT	·	3.8 km	MPC · JPL
108934	2001 PR_{23}	—	August 11, 2001	Haleakala	NEAT	·	2.2 km	MPC · JPL
108935	2001 PA_{24}	—	August 11, 2001	Haleakala	NEAT	·	5.3 km	MPC · JPL
108936	2001 PJ_{24}	—	August 11, 2001	Haleakala	NEAT	·	3.2 km	MPC · JPL
108937	2001 PF_{25}	—	August 11, 2001	Haleakala	NEAT	(5)	2.1 km	MPC · JPL
108938	2001 PP_{25}	—	August 11, 2001	Haleakala	NEAT	EUN	2.4 km	MPC · JPL
108939	2001 PR_{25}	—	August 11, 2001	Haleakala	NEAT	·	2.6 km	MPC · JPL
108940	2001 PT_{25}	—	August 11, 2001	Haleakala	NEAT	(5)	2.9 km	MPC · JPL
108941	2001 PH_{26}	—	August 11, 2001	Haleakala	NEAT	·	2.0 km	MPC · JPL
108942	2001 PL_{26}	—	August 11, 2001	Haleakala	NEAT	·	5.8 km	MPC · JPL
108943	2001 PO_{26}	—	August 11, 2001	Haleakala	NEAT	·	5.2 km	MPC · JPL
108944	2001 PW_{26}	—	August 11, 2001	Haleakala	NEAT	NYS	2.8 km	MPC · JPL
108945	2001 PH_{27}	—	August 11, 2001	Haleakala	NEAT	NYS	1.8 km	MPC · JPL
108946	2001 PR_{27}	—	August 11, 2001	Haleakala	NEAT	·	2.2 km	MPC · JPL
108947	2001 PV_{27}	—	August 13, 2001	Haleakala	NEAT	AGN	2.4 km	MPC · JPL
108948	2001 PC_{28}	—	August 14, 2001	Palomar	NEAT	·	3.2 km	MPC · JPL
108949	2001 PG_{28}	—	August 14, 2001	Haleakala	NEAT	EOS	5.4 km	MPC · JPL
108950	2001 PS_{28}	—	August 14, 2001	San Marcello	A. Boattini, L. Tesi	·	4.5 km	MPC · JPL
108951	2001 PT_{28}	—	August 15, 2001	Reedy Creek	J. Broughton	·	11 km	MPC · JPL
108952 Ilariacinelli	2001 PD_{29}	Ilariacinelli	August 15, 2001	San Marcello	M. Tombelli, A. Boattini	·	2.0 km	MPC · JPL
108953 Pieraerts	2001 PM_{29}	Pieraerts	August 13, 2001	Uccle	T. Pauwels	·	2.4 km	MPC · JPL
108954	2001 PD_{30}	—	August 10, 2001	Palomar	NEAT	URS	6.2 km	MPC · JPL
108955	2001 PE_{30}	—	August 10, 2001	Palomar	NEAT	·	2.5 km	MPC · JPL
108956	2001 PN_{30}	—	August 10, 2001	Palomar	NEAT	·	4.8 km	MPC · JPL
108957	2001 PC_{31}	—	August 10, 2001	Palomar	NEAT	MAR	1.7 km	MPC · JPL
108958	2001 PW_{31}	—	August 10, 2001	Palomar	NEAT	·	4.2 km	MPC · JPL
108959	2001 PD_{32}	—	August 10, 2001	Palomar	NEAT	·	3.1 km	MPC · JPL
108960	2001 PD_{33}	—	August 10, 2001	Palomar	NEAT	·	3.9 km	MPC · JPL
108961	2001 PE_{33}	—	August 10, 2001	Palomar	NEAT	EOS	4.0 km	MPC · JPL
108962	2001 PR_{33}	—	August 10, 2001	Palomar	NEAT	EOS	4.3 km	MPC · JPL
108963	2001 PK_{34}	—	August 10, 2001	Palomar	NEAT	·	2.5 km	MPC · JPL
108964	2001 PD_{35}	—	August 10, 2001	Palomar	NEAT	·	4.2 km	MPC · JPL
108965	2001 PW_{37}	—	August 11, 2001	Palomar	NEAT	EOS	4.8 km	MPC · JPL
108966	2001 PO_{38}	—	August 11, 2001	Palomar	NEAT	slow	6.9 km	MPC · JPL
108967	2001 PA_{40}	—	August 11, 2001	Palomar	NEAT	EOS	5.0 km	MPC · JPL
108968	2001 PE_{40}	—	August 11, 2001	Palomar	NEAT	CYB	9.2 km	MPC · JPL
108969	2001 PH_{41}	—	August 11, 2001	Palomar	NEAT	EOS	4.4 km	MPC · JPL
108970	2001 PK_{41}	—	August 11, 2001	Haleakala	NEAT	·	2.6 km	MPC · JPL
108971	2001 PL_{42}	—	August 12, 2001	Palomar	NEAT	URS · slow	7.3 km	MPC · JPL
108972	2001 PM_{42}	—	August 12, 2001	Palomar	NEAT	·	2.9 km	MPC · JPL
108973	2001 PV_{42}	—	August 12, 2001	Palomar	NEAT	·	3.2 km	MPC · JPL
108974	2001 PQ_{43}	—	August 13, 2001	Haleakala	NEAT	EOS	3.7 km	MPC · JPL
108975	2001 PR_{44}	—	August 15, 2001	Haleakala	NEAT	·	2.3 km	MPC · JPL
108976	2001 PK_{45}	—	August 11, 2001	Haleakala	NEAT	EOS	3.3 km	MPC · JPL
108977	2001 PN_{47}	—	August 13, 2001	Haleakala	NEAT	EOS	5.2 km	MPC · JPL
108978	2001 PU_{47}	—	August 13, 2001	Haleakala	NEAT	·	4.7 km	MPC · JPL
108979	2001 PD_{48}	—	August 3, 2001	Palomar	NEAT	·	9.7 km	MPC · JPL
108980	2001 PF_{48}	—	August 3, 2001	Haleakala	NEAT	·	4.6 km	MPC · JPL
108981	2001 PL_{48}	—	August 14, 2001	Palomar	NEAT	·	4.9 km	MPC · JPL
108982	2001 PN_{49}	—	August 14, 2001	Palomar	NEAT	·	2.7 km	MPC · JPL
108983	2001 PQ_{50}	—	August 14, 2001	Haleakala	NEAT	WIT	1.6 km	MPC · JPL
108984	2001 PT_{51}	—	August 15, 2001	Haleakala	NEAT	ARM	6.7 km	MPC · JPL
108985	2001 PW_{51}	—	August 15, 2001	Haleakala	NEAT	·	6.7 km	MPC · JPL
108986	2001 PJ_{52}	—	August 15, 2001	Haleakala	NEAT	LUT	8.4 km	MPC · JPL
108987	2001 PN_{52}	—	August 15, 2001	Haleakala	NEAT	EOS	4.0 km	MPC · JPL
108988	2001 PM_{54}	—	August 14, 2001	Haleakala	NEAT	KOR	2.1 km	MPC · JPL
108989	2001 PD_{55}	—	August 14, 2001	Haleakala	NEAT	·	3.9 km	MPC · JPL
108990	2001 PP_{55}	—	August 14, 2001	Haleakala	NEAT	·	3.4 km	MPC · JPL
108991	2001 PK_{56}	—	August 14, 2001	Haleakala	NEAT	·	3.6 km	MPC · JPL
108992	2001 PQ_{56}	—	August 14, 2001	Haleakala	NEAT	NYS	4.2 km	MPC · JPL
108993	2001 PR_{58}	—	August 14, 2001	Haleakala	NEAT	(5)	1.6 km	MPC · JPL
108994	2001 PG_{59}	—	August 14, 2001	Haleakala	NEAT	·	4.4 km	MPC · JPL
108995	2001 PH_{59}	—	August 14, 2001	Haleakala	NEAT	·	2.3 km	MPC · JPL
108996	2001 PR_{61}	—	August 13, 2001	Haleakala	NEAT	3:2	9.1 km	MPC · JPL
108997	2001 PB_{62}	—	August 13, 2001	Haleakala	NEAT	(5)	1.7 km	MPC · JPL
108998	2001 PP_{62}	—	August 13, 2001	Haleakala	NEAT	·	2.5 km	MPC · JPL
108999	2001 PF_{63}	—	August 13, 2001	Haleakala	NEAT	MAR	1.9 km	MPC · JPL
109000	2001 PZ_{64}	—	August 3, 2001	Palomar	NEAT	·	4.4 km	MPC · JPL

back to top

== See also ==
- Meanings of minor-planet names: 108001–109000
