= Meanings of minor-planet names: 108001–109000 =

As minor planet discoveries are confirmed, they are given a permanent number by the IAU's Minor Planet Center (MPC), and the discoverers can then submit names for them, following the IAU's naming conventions. The list below concerns those minor planets in the specified number-range that have received names, and explains the meanings of those names.

Official naming citations of newly named small Solar System bodies are approved and published in a bulletin by IAU's Working Group for Small Bodies Nomenclature (WGSBN). Before May 2021, citations were published in MPC's Minor Planet Circulars for many decades. Recent citations can also be found on the JPL Small-Body Database (SBDB). Until his death in 2016, German astronomer Lutz D. Schmadel compiled these citations into the Dictionary of Minor Planet Names (DMP) and regularly updated the collection.

Based on Paul Herget's The Names of the Minor Planets, Schmadel also researched the unclear origin of numerous asteroids, most of which had been named prior to World War II. This article incorporates text from this source, which is in the public domain: SBDB New namings may only be added to this list below after official publication as the preannouncement of names is condemned. The WGSBN publishes a comprehensive guideline for the naming rules of non-cometary small Solar System bodies.

== 108001–108100 ==
Named minor planet	Provisional	This minor planet was named for...	Ref · Catalog
108072 Odifreddi	2001 FN_{168}	Piergiorgio Odifreddi (born 1950), an Italian mathematician and logician.	JPL · 108072
108096 Melvin	2001 FY_{183}	As an astronaut, Leland Devon Melvin (born 1964) helped to build the International Space Station with flights aboard the space shuttle Atlantis in 2008 and 2009. Melvin is also an engineer with experience using sensors to assess damage of aerospace vehicles and was an NFL football player with the Detroit Lions.	JPL · 108096
108097 Satcher	2001 FO_{184}	Robert Lee Satcher Jr (born 1965) is an orthopedic surgeon, chemical engineer and retired NASA Astronaut. He was the first orthopedic surgeon in space and participated in two EVAs as part of a space shuttle flight to the International Space Station in 2009.	JPL · 108097

== 108101–108200 ==
back to top

Named minor planet	Provisional	This minor planet was named for...	Ref · Catalog
108113 Maza	2001 GK_{1}	José Maza Sancho (born 1948) has discovered 100 supernovae in 30 years of searching.From 1990 to 1996 he participated in the Calán-Tololo project calibrating type Ia supernovae for cosmological applications.	JPL · 108113
108140 Alir	2001 HO	Alphonse and Irène Hernandez, parents of one of the discoverers	JPL · 108140

== 108201–108300 ==
back to top

Named minor planet	Provisional	This minor planet was named for...	Ref · Catalog
108201 Di Blasi	2001 HJ_{22}	Giuseppe Di Blasi (1988–2005), cousin of Italian astronomer Dario Di Maria, one of the uncredited discoverers at the Farra d'Isonzo Observatory	JPL · 108201
108205 Baccipaolo	2001 HF_{23}	Paolo Bacci (born 1968), Italian amateur astronomer, member of the Gruppo Astrofili Montagna Pistoiese, and a discoverer of minor planets	JPL · 108205

== 108301–108400 ==
back to top

Named minor planet	Provisional	This minor planet was named for...	Ref · Catalog
108382 Karencilevitz	2001 KM_{21}	Karen Cilevitz (born 1957), South African-born Canadian amateur astronomer, member of the Royal Astronomical Society of Canada	JPL · 108382

== 108401–108500 ==
back to top

Named minor planet	Provisional	This minor planet was named for...	Ref · Catalog
108496 Sullenberger	2001 KD_{64}	Chesley Sullenberger (born 1951), a former US Airways airline captain, is celebrated for successfully landing his disabled airliner on the Hudson River off Manhattan without loss of life on 15 January 2009.	JPL · 108496

== 108501–108600 ==
back to top

Named minor planet	Provisional	This minor planet was named for...	Ref · Catalog
There are no named minor planets in this number range

== 108601–108700 ==
back to top

Named minor planet	Provisional	This minor planet was named for...	Ref · Catalog
There are no named minor planets in this number range

== 108701–108800 ==
back to top

Named minor planet	Provisional	This minor planet was named for...	Ref · Catalog
108702 Michelefoparri	2001 OX_{16}	Michele Forti Parri (born 1966), son of the second discoverer.	JPL · 108702
108720 Kamikuroiwa	2001 OT_{23}	Kamikuroiwa Iwakage Iseki, located in the town of Kuma Kogen, is the oldest grotto in Japan	JPL · 108720

== 108801–108900 ==
back to top

Named minor planet	Provisional	This minor planet was named for...	Ref · Catalog
There are no named minor planets in this number range

== 108901–109000 ==
back to top

Named minor planet	Provisional	This minor planet was named for...	Ref · Catalog
108952 Ilariacinelli	2001 PD_{29}	Ilaria Cinelli, an Italian biomedical engineer, Fellow of the Aerospace Medical Association, and a key contributor to the initiatives of the United Nations Office for Outer Space Affairs.	IAU · 108952
108953 Pieraerts	2001 PM_{29}	Godfried Thomas Pieraerts (1908–1984), a Flemish Norbertine Father at the Norbertine Abbey of Park Louvain (Belgium) and founder of the Mira observatory in Belgium	JPL · 108953

back to top

Preceded by 107,001–108,000	Meanings of minor-planet names List of minor planets: 108,001–109,000	Succeeded by 109,001–110,000
