= Desert Beaver Observatory =

Astronomical observatory in Arizona, US

- Observatory code: 919
- Location: Eloy, Arizona, United States
- Coordinates: 32°44′59″N 111°40′55″W
- Altitude: 261 m (856 ft)
- Established: 2000
- Location of Desert Beaver Observatory
- Related media on Commons

The Desert Beaver Observatory (IAU code 919) is a private astronomical observatory near Eloy, Arizona. The asteroid 25893 Sugihara was discovered at the Desert Beaver Observatory on 2 October 2000 by Canadian amateur astronomer William Kwong Yu Yeung.

== See also ==
- List of astronomical observatories
