= List of minor planets: 662001–663000 =

The following is a partial list of minor planets, running from minor-planet number 662001 through 663000, inclusive. The primary data for this and other partial lists is based on JPL's "Small-Body Orbital Elements" and data available from the Minor Planet Center. Critical list information is also provided by the MPC, unless otherwise specified from Lowell Observatory. A detailed description of the table's columns and additional sources are given on the main page including a complete list of every page in this series, and a statistical break-up on the dynamical classification of minor planets.

Also see the summary list of all named bodies in numerical and alphabetical order, and the corresponding naming citations for the number range of this particular list. New namings may only be added to this list after official publication, as the preannouncement of names is condemned by the Working Group for Small Bodies Nomenclature of the International Astronomical Union.

Near-Earth obj.	MBA (inner)	MBA (outer)	Centaur
Mars-crosser	MBA (middle)	Jupiter trojan	Trans-Neptunian obj.
Unclassified

== 662001–662100 ==
Designation			Discovery			Properties		Ref
Permanent	Provisional	Named after	Date	Site	Discoverer(s)	Category	Diam.	Ref
662001	2005 TD_{206}	—	January 27, 2017	Haleakala	Pan-STARRS 1	·	490 m	MPC · JPL
662002	2005 TH_{207}	—	October 12, 2005	Kitt Peak	Spacewatch	·	980 m	MPC · JPL
662003	2005 TT_{207}	—	October 10, 2005	Kitt Peak	Spacewatch	·	2.8 km	MPC · JPL
662004	2005 TQ_{209}	—	September 22, 2016	Mount Lemmon	Mount Lemmon Survey	HYG	2.3 km	MPC · JPL
662005	2005 TG_{215}	—	October 12, 2005	Kitt Peak	Spacewatch	EOS	1.3 km	MPC · JPL
662006	2005 TP_{215}	—	October 12, 2005	Kitt Peak	Spacewatch	·	1.9 km	MPC · JPL
662007	2005 TC_{216}	—	October 1, 2005	Mount Lemmon	Mount Lemmon Survey	3:2	4.9 km	MPC · JPL
662008	2005 TE_{216}	—	October 1, 2005	Mount Lemmon	Mount Lemmon Survey	·	1.2 km	MPC · JPL
662009	2005 TX_{216}	—	October 6, 2005	Kitt Peak	Spacewatch	·	1.9 km	MPC · JPL
662010	2005 UB_{12}	—	October 7, 2005	Catalina	CSS	·	540 m	MPC · JPL
662011	2005 UQ_{14}	—	October 22, 2005	Kitt Peak	Spacewatch	·	2.1 km	MPC · JPL
662012	2005 UJ_{34}	—	October 24, 2005	Kitt Peak	Spacewatch	PHO	580 m	MPC · JPL
662013	2005 UU_{39}	—	October 24, 2005	Kitt Peak	Spacewatch	EUN	1.2 km	MPC · JPL
662014	2005 UF_{58}	—	October 24, 2005	Kitt Peak	Spacewatch	·	2.4 km	MPC · JPL
662015	2005 UF_{62}	—	October 25, 2005	Mount Lemmon	Mount Lemmon Survey	3:2	4.2 km	MPC · JPL
662016	2005 UG_{62}	—	October 25, 2005	Mount Lemmon	Mount Lemmon Survey	THM	1.6 km	MPC · JPL
662017	2005 UN_{62}	—	October 25, 2005	Mount Lemmon	Mount Lemmon Survey	·	2.1 km	MPC · JPL
662018	2005 UR_{66}	—	October 22, 2005	Palomar	NEAT	·	2.3 km	MPC · JPL
662019	2005 UZ_{72}	—	October 23, 2005	Catalina	CSS	·	730 m	MPC · JPL
662020	2005 UZ_{75}	—	October 3, 2005	Palomar	NEAT	·	3.0 km	MPC · JPL
662021	2005 UA_{86}	—	October 22, 2005	Kitt Peak	Spacewatch	EUP	2.5 km	MPC · JPL
662022	2005 UL_{90}	—	October 22, 2005	Kitt Peak	Spacewatch	·	2.5 km	MPC · JPL
662023	2005 UE_{93}	—	October 22, 2005	Kitt Peak	Spacewatch	·	1.9 km	MPC · JPL
662024	2005 UB_{94}	—	October 22, 2005	Kitt Peak	Spacewatch	·	1.7 km	MPC · JPL
662025	2005 UN_{97}	—	October 22, 2005	Kitt Peak	Spacewatch	AGN	1.2 km	MPC · JPL
662026	2005 UR_{117}	—	October 24, 2005	Kitt Peak	Spacewatch	·	1.9 km	MPC · JPL
662027	2005 UV_{119}	—	October 24, 2005	Kitt Peak	Spacewatch	·	930 m	MPC · JPL
662028	2005 UK_{120}	—	October 24, 2005	Kitt Peak	Spacewatch	MAS	610 m	MPC · JPL
662029	2005 UC_{122}	—	October 24, 2005	Kitt Peak	Spacewatch	·	1.1 km	MPC · JPL
662030	2005 UJ_{122}	—	October 24, 2005	Kitt Peak	Spacewatch	·	2.2 km	MPC · JPL
662031	2005 UQ_{122}	—	October 24, 2005	Kitt Peak	Spacewatch	·	690 m	MPC · JPL
662032	2005 UR_{122}	—	October 24, 2005	Kitt Peak	Spacewatch	·	620 m	MPC · JPL
662033	2005 US_{125}	—	October 24, 2005	Kitt Peak	Spacewatch	·	2.2 km	MPC · JPL
662034	2005 UY_{125}	—	October 24, 2005	Kitt Peak	Spacewatch	·	1.3 km	MPC · JPL
662035	2005 UA_{132}	—	October 24, 2005	Kitt Peak	Spacewatch	JUN	880 m	MPC · JPL
662036	2005 UB_{134}	—	October 25, 2005	Kitt Peak	Spacewatch	·	2.1 km	MPC · JPL
662037	2005 UX_{136}	—	October 2, 2005	Mount Lemmon	Mount Lemmon Survey	·	430 m	MPC · JPL
662038	2005 UA_{140}	—	October 25, 2005	Mount Lemmon	Mount Lemmon Survey	·	2.0 km	MPC · JPL
662039	2005 UG_{150}	—	September 29, 2005	Kitt Peak	Spacewatch	·	2.2 km	MPC · JPL
662040	2005 UB_{152}	—	October 26, 2005	Kitt Peak	Spacewatch	·	660 m	MPC · JPL
662041	2005 UL_{159}	—	October 28, 2005	Mount Lemmon	Mount Lemmon Survey	·	1.0 km	MPC · JPL
662042	2005 UZ_{175}	—	October 24, 2005	Kitt Peak	Spacewatch	ADE	1.4 km	MPC · JPL
662043	2005 UR_{185}	—	October 25, 2005	Mount Lemmon	Mount Lemmon Survey	EOS	1.8 km	MPC · JPL
662044	2005 UP_{197}	—	October 12, 2005	Kitt Peak	Spacewatch	·	1.7 km	MPC · JPL
662045	2005 UG_{205}	—	October 26, 2005	Kitt Peak	Spacewatch	·	720 m	MPC · JPL
662046	2005 UG_{210}	—	October 27, 2005	Kitt Peak	Spacewatch	·	580 m	MPC · JPL
662047	2005 UK_{211}	—	October 27, 2005	Kitt Peak	Spacewatch	EOS	1.8 km	MPC · JPL
662048	2005 UA_{226}	—	October 25, 2005	Kitt Peak	Spacewatch	·	540 m	MPC · JPL
662049	2005 UK_{232}	—	October 25, 2005	Mount Lemmon	Mount Lemmon Survey	·	510 m	MPC · JPL
662050	2005 UL_{235}	—	October 25, 2005	Kitt Peak	Spacewatch	·	630 m	MPC · JPL
662051	2005 UJ_{236}	—	October 25, 2005	Kitt Peak	Spacewatch	·	2.3 km	MPC · JPL
662052	2005 UE_{238}	—	October 25, 2005	Kitt Peak	Spacewatch	EUN	860 m	MPC · JPL
662053	2005 UL_{258}	—	October 25, 2005	Kitt Peak	Spacewatch	·	770 m	MPC · JPL
662054	2005 UF_{262}	—	September 25, 2005	Kitt Peak	Spacewatch	·	530 m	MPC · JPL
662055	2005 UM_{263}	—	October 27, 2005	Kitt Peak	Spacewatch	·	1.8 km	MPC · JPL
662056	2005 UL_{265}	—	October 27, 2005	Kitt Peak	Spacewatch	MAR	900 m	MPC · JPL
662057	2005 UO_{266}	—	October 22, 2005	Kitt Peak	Spacewatch	·	2.6 km	MPC · JPL
662058	2005 UY_{268}	—	October 28, 2005	Mount Lemmon	Mount Lemmon Survey	·	660 m	MPC · JPL
662059	2005 UU_{269}	—	October 28, 2005	Mount Lemmon	Mount Lemmon Survey	THM	1.8 km	MPC · JPL
662060	2005 UN_{270}	—	October 28, 2005	Mount Lemmon	Mount Lemmon Survey	·	1.9 km	MPC · JPL
662061	2005 UL_{273}	—	October 28, 2005	Mount Lemmon	Mount Lemmon Survey	·	640 m	MPC · JPL
662062	2005 UZ_{276}	—	October 24, 2005	Kitt Peak	Spacewatch	·	2.2 km	MPC · JPL
662063	2005 UW_{277}	—	October 24, 2005	Kitt Peak	Spacewatch	·	1.2 km	MPC · JPL
662064	2005 UN_{278}	—	October 24, 2005	Kitt Peak	Spacewatch	·	570 m	MPC · JPL
662065	2005 UB_{283}	—	October 26, 2005	Kitt Peak	Spacewatch	·	3.3 km	MPC · JPL
662066	2005 UK_{288}	—	October 26, 2005	Kitt Peak	Spacewatch	·	550 m	MPC · JPL
662067	2005 UF_{290}	—	October 26, 2005	Kitt Peak	Spacewatch	·	2.5 km	MPC · JPL
662068	2005 UH_{290}	—	October 26, 2005	Kitt Peak	Spacewatch	·	1.3 km	MPC · JPL
662069	2005 US_{290}	—	October 22, 2005	Kitt Peak	Spacewatch	·	510 m	MPC · JPL
662070	2005 UJ_{300}	—	October 26, 2005	Kitt Peak	Spacewatch	·	2.5 km	MPC · JPL
662071	2005 UU_{303}	—	October 26, 2005	Kitt Peak	Spacewatch	PHO	600 m	MPC · JPL
662072	2005 UE_{305}	—	September 19, 1995	Kitt Peak	Spacewatch	·	1.7 km	MPC · JPL
662073	2005 UL_{318}	—	October 27, 2005	Kitt Peak	Spacewatch	·	1.3 km	MPC · JPL
662074	2005 UN_{324}	—	October 28, 2005	Mount Lemmon	Mount Lemmon Survey	·	1.1 km	MPC · JPL
662075	2005 UN_{326}	—	October 29, 2005	Kitt Peak	Spacewatch	·	1.0 km	MPC · JPL
662076	2005 UO_{333}	—	October 27, 2005	Kitt Peak	Spacewatch	·	2.1 km	MPC · JPL
662077	2005 UU_{336}	—	October 1, 1995	Kitt Peak	Spacewatch	·	1.6 km	MPC · JPL
662078	2005 UE_{337}	—	October 22, 2005	Kitt Peak	Spacewatch	EOS	1.4 km	MPC · JPL
662079	2005 UB_{341}	—	October 31, 2005	Kitt Peak	Spacewatch	(5)	1.1 km	MPC · JPL
662080	2005 UE_{342}	—	October 31, 2005	Mount Lemmon	Mount Lemmon Survey	·	3.0 km	MPC · JPL
662081	2005 UQ_{347}	—	October 31, 2005	Kitt Peak	Spacewatch	·	710 m	MPC · JPL
662082	2005 UF_{360}	—	October 25, 2005	Mount Lemmon	Mount Lemmon Survey	·	1.9 km	MPC · JPL
662083	2005 UF_{370}	—	October 27, 2005	Kitt Peak	Spacewatch	KOR	1.2 km	MPC · JPL
662084	2005 UP_{372}	—	October 22, 2005	Kitt Peak	Spacewatch	·	550 m	MPC · JPL
662085	2005 UV_{372}	—	March 23, 2003	Kitt Peak	Spacewatch	NYS	950 m	MPC · JPL
662086	2005 UD_{374}	—	October 27, 2005	Kitt Peak	Spacewatch	·	2.1 km	MPC · JPL
662087	2005 UZ_{377}	—	October 28, 2005	Mount Lemmon	Mount Lemmon Survey	·	1.2 km	MPC · JPL
662088	2005 UA_{378}	—	October 28, 2005	Mount Lemmon	Mount Lemmon Survey	·	1.9 km	MPC · JPL
662089	2005 UC_{379}	—	October 29, 2005	Mount Lemmon	Mount Lemmon Survey	THB	1.8 km	MPC · JPL
662090	2005 UV_{380}	—	October 30, 2005	Mount Lemmon	Mount Lemmon Survey	·	2.0 km	MPC · JPL
662091	2005 UX_{380}	—	October 30, 2005	Mount Lemmon	Mount Lemmon Survey	·	1.7 km	MPC · JPL
662092	2005 UU_{384}	—	October 27, 2005	Kitt Peak	Spacewatch	·	2.5 km	MPC · JPL
662093	2005 UL_{394}	—	October 29, 2005	Catalina	CSS	·	660 m	MPC · JPL
662094	2005 UV_{396}	—	October 7, 2005	Anderson Mesa	LONEOS	·	720 m	MPC · JPL
662095	2005 UR_{397}	—	October 7, 2005	Catalina	CSS	·	610 m	MPC · JPL
662096	2005 UA_{398}	—	October 30, 2005	Socorro	LINEAR	·	600 m	MPC · JPL
662097	2005 UV_{400}	—	September 13, 2005	Kitt Peak	Spacewatch	·	660 m	MPC · JPL
662098	2005 UB_{401}	—	August 31, 2005	Palomar	NEAT	·	660 m	MPC · JPL
662099	2005 UU_{403}	—	October 1, 2005	Mount Lemmon	Mount Lemmon Survey	·	1.5 km	MPC · JPL
662100	2005 UB_{406}	—	August 25, 2005	Palomar	NEAT	·	1.0 km	MPC · JPL

== 662101–662200 ==
back to top

Designation			Discovery			Properties		Ref
Permanent	Provisional	Named after	Date	Site	Discoverer(s)	Category	Diam.	Ref
662101	2005 UY_{407}	—	October 31, 2005	Mount Lemmon	Mount Lemmon Survey	·	2.5 km	MPC · JPL
662102	2005 UE_{408}	—	October 31, 2005	Mount Lemmon	Mount Lemmon Survey	KOR	1.1 km	MPC · JPL
662103	2005 UW_{410}	—	October 31, 2005	Mount Lemmon	Mount Lemmon Survey	·	2.4 km	MPC · JPL
662104	2005 UJ_{415}	—	October 25, 2005	Kitt Peak	Spacewatch	·	640 m	MPC · JPL
662105	2005 UU_{416}	—	October 25, 2005	Kitt Peak	Spacewatch	·	410 m	MPC · JPL
662106	2005 UE_{417}	—	October 25, 2005	Kitt Peak	Spacewatch	MAS	480 m	MPC · JPL
662107	2005 UC_{422}	—	October 5, 2005	Kitt Peak	Spacewatch	AGN	960 m	MPC · JPL
662108	2005 UF_{425}	—	October 24, 2005	Kitt Peak	Spacewatch	·	610 m	MPC · JPL
662109	2005 UC_{433}	—	October 28, 2005	Kitt Peak	Spacewatch	·	2.1 km	MPC · JPL
662110	2005 UR_{433}	—	October 28, 2005	Kitt Peak	Spacewatch	·	2.7 km	MPC · JPL
662111	2005 UE_{441}	—	October 23, 2005	Catalina	CSS	·	630 m	MPC · JPL
662112	2005 UX_{447}	—	October 23, 2005	Catalina	CSS	EUP	3.1 km	MPC · JPL
662113	2005 UG_{454}	—	October 8, 2005	Socorro	LINEAR	·	680 m	MPC · JPL
662114	2005 UY_{454}	—	October 28, 2005	Catalina	CSS	·	1.4 km	MPC · JPL
662115	2005 UQ_{458}	—	October 30, 2005	Mount Lemmon	Mount Lemmon Survey	·	1.4 km	MPC · JPL
662116	2005 UQ_{464}	—	October 30, 2005	Kitt Peak	Spacewatch	·	620 m	MPC · JPL
662117	2005 UF_{483}	—	September 25, 2005	Kitt Peak	Spacewatch	·	2.0 km	MPC · JPL
662118	2005 UA_{485}	—	October 22, 2005	Catalina	CSS	·	1.2 km	MPC · JPL
662119	2005 UV_{485}	—	October 22, 2005	Palomar	NEAT	·	750 m	MPC · JPL
662120	2005 UR_{486}	—	September 1, 2005	Palomar	NEAT	·	670 m	MPC · JPL
662121	2005 UQ_{490}	—	October 23, 2005	Catalina	CSS	·	2.9 km	MPC · JPL
662122	2005 UX_{497}	—	October 27, 2005	Anderson Mesa	LONEOS	H	460 m	MPC · JPL
662123	2005 UU_{502}	—	October 31, 2005	Anderson Mesa	LONEOS	·	1.5 km	MPC · JPL
662124	2005 UK_{511}	—	October 27, 2005	Mount Lemmon	Mount Lemmon Survey	·	2.0 km	MPC · JPL
662125	2005 UV_{514}	—	October 25, 2005	Apache Point	SDSS Collaboration	·	2.2 km	MPC · JPL
662126	2005 UJ_{515}	—	October 30, 2005	Apache Point	SDSS Collaboration	·	2.7 km	MPC · JPL
662127	2005 UM_{516}	—	September 30, 2005	Côtes de Meuse	M. Dawson, M. Kaschinski	·	1.5 km	MPC · JPL
662128	2005 UQ_{518}	—	October 25, 2005	Apache Point	SDSS Collaboration	·	1.9 km	MPC · JPL
662129	2005 US_{520}	—	October 27, 2005	Apache Point	SDSS Collaboration	·	2.5 km	MPC · JPL
662130	2005 UT_{523}	—	October 30, 2005	Apache Point	SDSS Collaboration	EOS	1.5 km	MPC · JPL
662131 Kierancarroll	2005 UE_{525}	Kierancarroll	October 27, 2005	Mauna Kea	P. A. Wiegert, D. D. Balam	·	2.2 km	MPC · JPL
662132	2005 UA_{528}	—	October 27, 2005	Mount Lemmon	Mount Lemmon Survey	·	1.3 km	MPC · JPL
662133	2005 UV_{529}	—	September 30, 2005	Mount Lemmon	Mount Lemmon Survey	·	2.3 km	MPC · JPL
662134	2005 UW_{529}	—	October 31, 2005	Kitt Peak	Spacewatch	EOS	1.7 km	MPC · JPL
662135	2005 UW_{530}	—	October 27, 2005	Catalina	CSS	·	1.4 km	MPC · JPL
662136	2005 UB_{531}	—	October 30, 2005	Mount Lemmon	Mount Lemmon Survey	·	550 m	MPC · JPL
662137	2005 UF_{533}	—	October 25, 2005	Mount Lemmon	Mount Lemmon Survey	·	2.5 km	MPC · JPL
662138	2005 UE_{535}	—	December 27, 2006	Mount Lemmon	Mount Lemmon Survey	·	2.8 km	MPC · JPL
662139	2005 UK_{535}	—	October 27, 2005	Kitt Peak	Spacewatch	·	2.0 km	MPC · JPL
662140	2005 UX_{535}	—	February 15, 2013	Haleakala	Pan-STARRS 1	TIR	2.2 km	MPC · JPL
662141	2005 US_{536}	—	October 24, 2005	Kitt Peak	Spacewatch	·	770 m	MPC · JPL
662142	2005 UW_{536}	—	October 26, 2005	Kitt Peak	Spacewatch	V	540 m	MPC · JPL
662143	2005 UA_{537}	—	May 7, 2014	Haleakala	Pan-STARRS 1	·	550 m	MPC · JPL
662144	2005 UT_{538}	—	February 14, 2013	Kitt Peak	Spacewatch	·	2.3 km	MPC · JPL
662145	2005 UD_{540}	—	December 3, 2010	Mount Lemmon	Mount Lemmon Survey	·	1.5 km	MPC · JPL
662146	2005 UO_{540}	—	December 21, 2015	Mount Lemmon	Mount Lemmon Survey	·	680 m	MPC · JPL
662147	2005 UR_{542}	—	October 27, 2005	Kitt Peak	Spacewatch	EUN	810 m	MPC · JPL
662148	2005 UB_{543}	—	October 25, 2005	Kitt Peak	Spacewatch	·	640 m	MPC · JPL
662149	2005 UB_{545}	—	October 12, 2015	Haleakala	Pan-STARRS 1	·	590 m	MPC · JPL
662150	2005 UB_{546}	—	April 29, 2014	Haleakala	Pan-STARRS 1	·	2.5 km	MPC · JPL
662151	2005 UC_{550}	—	October 28, 2005	Catalina	CSS	·	940 m	MPC · JPL
662152	2005 UF_{554}	—	October 31, 2005	Kitt Peak	Spacewatch	·	2.4 km	MPC · JPL
662153	2005 UF_{558}	—	October 27, 2005	Mount Lemmon	Mount Lemmon Survey	THM	1.3 km	MPC · JPL
662154	2005 UE_{560}	—	October 27, 2005	Kitt Peak	Spacewatch	·	2.1 km	MPC · JPL
662155	2005 VF_{9}	—	October 24, 2005	Kitt Peak	Spacewatch	·	1.2 km	MPC · JPL
662156	2005 VO_{17}	—	November 4, 2005	Mount Lemmon	Mount Lemmon Survey	·	730 m	MPC · JPL
662157	2005 VM_{21}	—	October 27, 2005	Kitt Peak	Spacewatch	·	2.4 km	MPC · JPL
662158	2005 VP_{23}	—	November 1, 2005	Kitt Peak	Spacewatch	·	550 m	MPC · JPL
662159	2005 VX_{27}	—	October 27, 2005	Kitt Peak	Spacewatch	·	540 m	MPC · JPL
662160	2005 VK_{30}	—	November 4, 2005	Kitt Peak	Spacewatch	·	2.4 km	MPC · JPL
662161	2005 VY_{36}	—	September 30, 2005	Mount Lemmon	Mount Lemmon Survey	·	2.7 km	MPC · JPL
662162	2005 VZ_{37}	—	November 3, 2005	Mount Lemmon	Mount Lemmon Survey	·	1.6 km	MPC · JPL
662163	2005 VG_{38}	—	November 3, 2005	Mount Lemmon	Mount Lemmon Survey	·	1.6 km	MPC · JPL
662164	2005 VQ_{43}	—	September 23, 2005	Kitt Peak	Spacewatch	·	1.4 km	MPC · JPL
662165	2005 VR_{48}	—	November 5, 2005	Mount Lemmon	Mount Lemmon Survey	·	1.1 km	MPC · JPL
662166	2005 VC_{49}	—	October 8, 2005	Catalina	CSS	·	1.5 km	MPC · JPL
662167	2005 VG_{51}	—	September 27, 2005	Palomar	NEAT	·	770 m	MPC · JPL
662168	2005 VQ_{59}	—	November 5, 2005	Kitt Peak	Spacewatch	KOR	1.1 km	MPC · JPL
662169	2005 VO_{62}	—	November 3, 2005	Kitt Peak	Spacewatch	EUN	1.0 km	MPC · JPL
662170	2005 VB_{68}	—	November 2, 2005	Mount Lemmon	Mount Lemmon Survey	·	1.0 km	MPC · JPL
662171	2005 VP_{68}	—	November 4, 2005	Kitt Peak	Spacewatch	·	2.7 km	MPC · JPL
662172	2005 VQ_{68}	—	November 4, 2005	Kitt Peak	Spacewatch	(5)	1.1 km	MPC · JPL
662173	2005 VT_{71}	—	November 4, 2005	Mount Lemmon	Mount Lemmon Survey	·	1.4 km	MPC · JPL
662174	2005 VL_{74}	—	November 4, 2005	Mount Lemmon	Mount Lemmon Survey	(5)	1.2 km	MPC · JPL
662175	2005 VC_{83}	—	March 10, 2003	Kitt Peak	Spacewatch	·	1.1 km	MPC · JPL
662176	2005 VG_{83}	—	November 3, 2005	Mount Lemmon	Mount Lemmon Survey	VER	2.0 km	MPC · JPL
662177	2005 VM_{85}	—	November 4, 2005	Kitt Peak	Spacewatch	·	2.9 km	MPC · JPL
662178	2005 VB_{86}	—	November 4, 2005	Mount Lemmon	Mount Lemmon Survey	·	2.3 km	MPC · JPL
662179	2005 VN_{95}	—	November 6, 2005	Kitt Peak	Spacewatch	·	790 m	MPC · JPL
662180	2005 VP_{96}	—	October 28, 2005	Kitt Peak	Spacewatch	·	550 m	MPC · JPL
662181	2005 VY_{99}	—	November 3, 2005	Kitt Peak	Spacewatch	·	480 m	MPC · JPL
662182	2005 VG_{112}	—	November 6, 2005	Mount Lemmon	Mount Lemmon Survey	·	1.1 km	MPC · JPL
662183	2005 VJ_{115}	—	November 11, 2005	Kitt Peak	Spacewatch	EOS	2.0 km	MPC · JPL
662184	2005 VD_{127}	—	September 25, 2005	Kitt Peak	Spacewatch	·	940 m	MPC · JPL
662185	2005 VF_{131}	—	October 25, 2005	Apache Point	SDSS Collaboration	EOS	1.5 km	MPC · JPL
662186	2005 VT_{133}	—	March 12, 2007	Kitt Peak	Spacewatch	MAR	840 m	MPC · JPL
662187	2005 VT_{135}	—	November 5, 2005	Kitt Peak	Spacewatch	·	1.9 km	MPC · JPL
662188	2005 VQ_{138}	—	November 1, 2005	Kitt Peak	Spacewatch	·	1.1 km	MPC · JPL
662189	2005 VC_{139}	—	December 18, 2015	Mount Lemmon	Mount Lemmon Survey	·	510 m	MPC · JPL
662190	2005 VH_{140}	—	November 7, 2005	Mauna Kea	A. Boattini	·	1.4 km	MPC · JPL
662191	2005 VK_{140}	—	November 12, 2005	Kitt Peak	Spacewatch	·	1.0 km	MPC · JPL
662192	2005 VV_{140}	—	November 12, 2005	Kitt Peak	Spacewatch	V	470 m	MPC · JPL
662193	2005 VG_{144}	—	November 1, 2005	Mount Lemmon	Mount Lemmon Survey	·	2.3 km	MPC · JPL
662194	2005 VW_{145}	—	November 1, 2005	Kitt Peak	Spacewatch	·	1.2 km	MPC · JPL
662195	2005 VB_{146}	—	November 7, 2005	Mauna Kea	A. Boattini	·	1.4 km	MPC · JPL
662196	2005 VR_{147}	—	May 5, 1997	Kitt Peak	Spacewatch	HYG	2.5 km	MPC · JPL
662197	2005 VS_{147}	—	October 25, 2016	Haleakala	Pan-STARRS 1	·	2.6 km	MPC · JPL
662198	2005 VC_{148}	—	November 12, 2005	Kitt Peak	Spacewatch	·	660 m	MPC · JPL
662199	2005 VD_{148}	—	December 16, 2006	Mount Lemmon	Mount Lemmon Survey	·	2.3 km	MPC · JPL
662200	2005 VU_{149}	—	November 1, 2005	Mount Lemmon	Mount Lemmon Survey	·	1.2 km	MPC · JPL

== 662201–662300 ==
back to top

Designation			Discovery			Properties		Ref
Permanent	Provisional	Named after	Date	Site	Discoverer(s)	Category	Diam.	Ref
662201	2005 VU_{151}	—	November 3, 2005	Catalina	CSS	·	640 m	MPC · JPL
662202	2005 WD_{2}	—	November 21, 2005	Socorro	LINEAR	·	660 m	MPC · JPL
662203	2005 WR_{2}	—	November 23, 2005	Socorro	LINEAR	APO	450 m	MPC · JPL
662204	2005 WP_{5}	—	October 24, 2005	Kitt Peak	Spacewatch	THM	2.2 km	MPC · JPL
662205	2005 WJ_{10}	—	November 21, 2005	Catalina	CSS	·	2.6 km	MPC · JPL
662206	2005 WE_{13}	—	November 22, 2005	Kitt Peak	Spacewatch	·	2.2 km	MPC · JPL
662207	2005 WE_{37}	—	November 1, 2005	Mount Lemmon	Mount Lemmon Survey	·	790 m	MPC · JPL
662208	2005 WD_{42}	—	October 28, 2005	Kitt Peak	Spacewatch	ADE	1.2 km	MPC · JPL
662209	2005 WV_{45}	—	November 22, 2005	Kitt Peak	Spacewatch	KOR	1.6 km	MPC · JPL
662210	2005 WO_{57}	—	November 25, 2005	Catalina	CSS	·	1.4 km	MPC · JPL
662211	2005 WQ_{65}	—	October 28, 2005	Mount Lemmon	Mount Lemmon Survey	·	1.4 km	MPC · JPL
662212	2005 WL_{70}	—	November 26, 2005	Mount Lemmon	Mount Lemmon Survey	·	830 m	MPC · JPL
662213	2005 WA_{77}	—	November 25, 2005	Kitt Peak	Spacewatch	·	2.2 km	MPC · JPL
662214	2005 WF_{77}	—	November 25, 2005	Kitt Peak	Spacewatch	·	2.8 km	MPC · JPL
662215	2005 WW_{91}	—	November 25, 2005	Mount Lemmon	Mount Lemmon Survey	·	2.8 km	MPC · JPL
662216	2005 WL_{93}	—	November 25, 2005	Mount Lemmon	Mount Lemmon Survey	MAS	490 m	MPC · JPL
662217	2005 WK_{96}	—	November 26, 2005	Kitt Peak	Spacewatch	·	2.5 km	MPC · JPL
662218	2005 WS_{107}	—	November 3, 2005	Mount Lemmon	Mount Lemmon Survey	V	640 m	MPC · JPL
662219	2005 WJ_{109}	—	November 30, 2005	Kitt Peak	Spacewatch	KOR	1.3 km	MPC · JPL
662220	2005 WE_{135}	—	November 25, 2005	Mount Lemmon	Mount Lemmon Survey	·	1.4 km	MPC · JPL
662221	2005 WV_{135}	—	November 26, 2005	Kitt Peak	Spacewatch	·	1.7 km	MPC · JPL
662222	2005 WD_{139}	—	November 26, 2005	Mount Lemmon	Mount Lemmon Survey	·	2.7 km	MPC · JPL
662223	2005 WQ_{160}	—	October 1, 2005	Kitt Peak	Spacewatch	·	2.5 km	MPC · JPL
662224	2005 WU_{160}	—	November 28, 2005	Kitt Peak	Spacewatch	·	1.0 km	MPC · JPL
662225	2005 WW_{164}	—	November 29, 2005	Kitt Peak	Spacewatch	·	1.1 km	MPC · JPL
662226	2005 WK_{166}	—	November 29, 2005	Mount Lemmon	Mount Lemmon Survey	·	2.4 km	MPC · JPL
662227	2005 WT_{172}	—	November 30, 2005	Mount Lemmon	Mount Lemmon Survey	EOS	1.7 km	MPC · JPL
662228	2005 WR_{177}	—	November 30, 2005	Kitt Peak	Spacewatch	V	450 m	MPC · JPL
662229	2005 WO_{186}	—	November 29, 2005	Mount Lemmon	Mount Lemmon Survey	·	1.5 km	MPC · JPL
662230	2005 WR_{191}	—	November 24, 2005	Palomar	NEAT	·	3.3 km	MPC · JPL
662231	2005 WZ_{200}	—	November 26, 2005	Kitt Peak	Spacewatch	·	1.2 km	MPC · JPL
662232	2005 WW_{202}	—	November 30, 2005	Kitt Peak	Spacewatch	·	1.7 km	MPC · JPL
662233	2005 WJ_{205}	—	November 3, 2005	Kitt Peak	Spacewatch	·	610 m	MPC · JPL
662234	2005 WP_{212}	—	November 26, 2005	Mount Lemmon	Mount Lemmon Survey	·	2.6 km	MPC · JPL
662235	2005 WZ_{212}	—	November 30, 2005	Kitt Peak	Spacewatch	·	2.0 km	MPC · JPL
662236	2005 WN_{213}	—	May 15, 2012	Haleakala	Pan-STARRS 1	·	1.9 km	MPC · JPL
662237	2005 WG_{216}	—	November 25, 2005	Kitt Peak	Spacewatch	·	630 m	MPC · JPL
662238	2005 WD_{219}	—	November 30, 2005	Kitt Peak	Spacewatch	·	2.6 km	MPC · JPL
662239	2005 WP_{219}	—	November 25, 2005	Catalina	CSS	·	2.2 km	MPC · JPL
662240	2005 XU_{2}	—	November 6, 2005	Kitt Peak	Spacewatch	·	950 m	MPC · JPL
662241	2005 XH_{6}	—	December 2, 2005	Kitt Peak	Spacewatch	·	460 m	MPC · JPL
662242	2005 XK_{7}	—	November 28, 2005	Mount Lemmon	Mount Lemmon Survey	·	2.4 km	MPC · JPL
662243	2005 XS_{11}	—	December 1, 2005	Kitt Peak	Spacewatch	·	1.8 km	MPC · JPL
662244	2005 XQ_{12}	—	November 22, 2005	Kitt Peak	Spacewatch	·	2.1 km	MPC · JPL
662245	2005 XO_{16}	—	December 1, 2005	Kitt Peak	Spacewatch	·	2.4 km	MPC · JPL
662246	2005 XG_{19}	—	December 2, 2005	Kitt Peak	Spacewatch	EOS	1.4 km	MPC · JPL
662247	2005 XQ_{27}	—	November 28, 2005	Catalina	CSS	·	1.2 km	MPC · JPL
662248	2005 XK_{28}	—	December 1, 2005	Catalina	CSS	·	1.4 km	MPC · JPL
662249	2005 XM_{29}	—	October 24, 2005	Palomar	NEAT	·	1.0 km	MPC · JPL
662250	2005 XZ_{33}	—	December 4, 2005	Kitt Peak	Spacewatch	·	1.1 km	MPC · JPL
662251	2005 XF_{40}	—	December 5, 2005	Mount Lemmon	Mount Lemmon Survey	·	800 m	MPC · JPL
662252	2005 XP_{40}	—	December 5, 2005	Kitt Peak	Spacewatch	·	1.2 km	MPC · JPL
662253	2005 XV_{44}	—	December 2, 2005	Kitt Peak	Spacewatch	·	2.1 km	MPC · JPL
662254	2005 XS_{47}	—	December 2, 2005	Kitt Peak	Spacewatch	·	1.3 km	MPC · JPL
662255	2005 XT_{47}	—	December 2, 2005	Kitt Peak	Spacewatch	·	2.3 km	MPC · JPL
662256	2005 XT_{54}	—	November 26, 2005	Mount Lemmon	Mount Lemmon Survey	·	3.5 km	MPC · JPL
662257	2005 XE_{62}	—	November 22, 2005	Kitt Peak	Spacewatch	·	2.7 km	MPC · JPL
662258	2005 XB_{63}	—	December 5, 2005	Mount Lemmon	Mount Lemmon Survey	·	2.9 km	MPC · JPL
662259	2005 XG_{67}	—	December 5, 2005	Kitt Peak	Spacewatch	KOR	1.4 km	MPC · JPL
662260	2005 XD_{81}	—	December 7, 2005	Kitt Peak	Spacewatch	·	1.5 km	MPC · JPL
662261	2005 XM_{81}	—	December 7, 2005	Kitt Peak	Spacewatch	·	2.8 km	MPC · JPL
662262	2005 XL_{85}	—	December 2, 2005	Kitt Peak	Spacewatch	·	870 m	MPC · JPL
662263	2005 XA_{87}	—	December 10, 2005	Kitt Peak	Spacewatch	GAL	1.6 km	MPC · JPL
662264	2005 XV_{98}	—	October 7, 2005	Kitt Peak	Spacewatch	EOS	1.7 km	MPC · JPL
662265	2005 XL_{105}	—	January 5, 2006	Mount Lemmon	Mount Lemmon Survey	VER	2.5 km	MPC · JPL
662266	2005 XC_{110}	—	December 3, 2005	Mauna Kea	A. Boattini	·	1.5 km	MPC · JPL
662267	2005 XQ_{111}	—	December 1, 2005	Kitt Peak	Wasserman, L. H., Millis, R. L.	EOS	1.5 km	MPC · JPL
662268	2005 XU_{111}	—	October 1, 2005	Mount Lemmon	Mount Lemmon Survey	·	2.9 km	MPC · JPL
662269	2005 XO_{119}	—	January 2, 2012	Kitt Peak	Spacewatch	·	4.0 km	MPC · JPL
662270	2005 XV_{119}	—	December 1, 2005	Kitt Peak	Wasserman, L. H., Millis, R. L.	·	1.8 km	MPC · JPL
662271	2005 XY_{119}	—	December 1, 2005	Catalina	CSS	·	3.3 km	MPC · JPL
662272	2005 XA_{121}	—	November 23, 2016	Mount Lemmon	Mount Lemmon Survey	·	2.6 km	MPC · JPL
662273	2005 XN_{122}	—	December 1, 2005	Kitt Peak	Spacewatch	·	750 m	MPC · JPL
662274	2005 XT_{122}	—	December 7, 2005	Kitt Peak	Spacewatch	·	860 m	MPC · JPL
662275	2005 XU_{122}	—	November 24, 2009	Kitt Peak	Spacewatch	·	730 m	MPC · JPL
662276	2005 XC_{123}	—	September 30, 2009	Mount Lemmon	Mount Lemmon Survey	(5)	1.0 km	MPC · JPL
662277	2005 XB_{124}	—	November 11, 2013	Mount Lemmon	Mount Lemmon Survey	HNS	740 m	MPC · JPL
662278	2005 XU_{125}	—	October 3, 2015	Haleakala	Pan-STARRS 1	·	2.5 km	MPC · JPL
662279	2005 XG_{126}	—	October 28, 2005	Mount Lemmon	Mount Lemmon Survey	EOS	1.8 km	MPC · JPL
662280	2005 XW_{126}	—	December 4, 2005	Mount Lemmon	Mount Lemmon Survey	·	2.6 km	MPC · JPL
662281	2005 XW_{129}	—	December 23, 2017	Mount Lemmon	Mount Lemmon Survey	·	2.0 km	MPC · JPL
662282	2005 XE_{130}	—	August 17, 2012	Haleakala	Pan-STARRS 1	·	1.1 km	MPC · JPL
662283	2005 XD_{131}	—	December 6, 2005	Kitt Peak	Spacewatch	VER	2.5 km	MPC · JPL
662284	2005 XC_{132}	—	December 1, 2005	Mount Lemmon	Mount Lemmon Survey	·	830 m	MPC · JPL
662285	2005 XD_{132}	—	December 7, 2005	Kitt Peak	Spacewatch	·	700 m	MPC · JPL
662286	2005 XM_{132}	—	December 4, 2005	Kitt Peak	Spacewatch	EUN	930 m	MPC · JPL
662287	2005 XT_{134}	—	December 2, 2005	Kitt Peak	Spacewatch	·	2.6 km	MPC · JPL
662288	2005 XA_{135}	—	December 11, 2005	La Silla	La Silla	·	1.3 km	MPC · JPL
662289	2005 YP_{3}	—	December 21, 2005	Gnosca	S. Sposetti	EUN	960 m	MPC · JPL
662290	2005 YS_{4}	—	December 15, 2001	Apache Point	SDSS Collaboration	·	1.4 km	MPC · JPL
662291	2005 YO_{15}	—	December 22, 2005	Kitt Peak	Spacewatch	·	1.3 km	MPC · JPL
662292	2005 YD_{17}	—	November 22, 2005	Kitt Peak	Spacewatch	·	1.3 km	MPC · JPL
662293	2005 YT_{17}	—	November 6, 2005	Mount Lemmon	Mount Lemmon Survey	·	2.5 km	MPC · JPL
662294	2005 YE_{26}	—	December 1, 2005	Mount Lemmon	Mount Lemmon Survey	·	790 m	MPC · JPL
662295	2005 YK_{26}	—	November 25, 2005	Mount Lemmon	Mount Lemmon Survey	·	760 m	MPC · JPL
662296	2005 YQ_{43}	—	November 30, 2005	Kitt Peak	Spacewatch	·	610 m	MPC · JPL
662297	2005 YR_{56}	—	November 1, 2005	Mount Lemmon	Mount Lemmon Survey	·	2.3 km	MPC · JPL
662298	2005 YR_{65}	—	December 25, 2005	Kitt Peak	Spacewatch	·	2.9 km	MPC · JPL
662299	2005 YJ_{71}	—	December 24, 2005	Kitt Peak	Spacewatch	·	2.5 km	MPC · JPL
662300	2005 YO_{71}	—	December 2, 2005	Kitt Peak	Spacewatch	·	550 m	MPC · JPL

== 662301–662400 ==
back to top

Designation			Discovery			Properties		Ref
Permanent	Provisional	Named after	Date	Site	Discoverer(s)	Category	Diam.	Ref
662301	2005 YZ_{84}	—	December 25, 2005	Mount Lemmon	Mount Lemmon Survey	NYS	1.1 km	MPC · JPL
662302	2005 YX_{87}	—	December 25, 2005	Mount Lemmon	Mount Lemmon Survey	·	920 m	MPC · JPL
662303	2005 YD_{89}	—	November 10, 2005	Mount Lemmon	Mount Lemmon Survey	(5)	1.0 km	MPC · JPL
662304	2005 YJ_{97}	—	December 24, 2005	Kitt Peak	Spacewatch	·	1.7 km	MPC · JPL
662305	2005 YT_{101}	—	December 25, 2005	Kitt Peak	Spacewatch	EOS	1.3 km	MPC · JPL
662306	2005 YZ_{103}	—	December 25, 2005	Kitt Peak	Spacewatch	·	630 m	MPC · JPL
662307	2005 YS_{105}	—	December 1, 2005	Mount Lemmon	Mount Lemmon Survey	·	1.5 km	MPC · JPL
662308	2005 YO_{120}	—	December 27, 2005	Mount Lemmon	Mount Lemmon Survey	EOS	2.2 km	MPC · JPL
662309	2005 YQ_{123}	—	July 5, 2003	Kitt Peak	Spacewatch	·	3.6 km	MPC · JPL
662310	2005 YZ_{127}	—	December 24, 2005	Kitt Peak	Spacewatch	·	660 m	MPC · JPL
662311	2005 YJ_{129}	—	October 30, 2005	Mount Lemmon	Mount Lemmon Survey	·	1.0 km	MPC · JPL
662312	2005 YL_{134}	—	December 26, 2005	Kitt Peak	Spacewatch	·	1.2 km	MPC · JPL
662313	2005 YT_{138}	—	December 26, 2005	Kitt Peak	Spacewatch	·	980 m	MPC · JPL
662314	2005 YV_{138}	—	December 26, 2005	Kitt Peak	Spacewatch	·	520 m	MPC · JPL
662315	2005 YK_{146}	—	December 29, 2005	Mount Lemmon	Mount Lemmon Survey	PHO	1.0 km	MPC · JPL
662316	2005 YZ_{149}	—	December 25, 2005	Kitt Peak	Spacewatch	NYS	590 m	MPC · JPL
662317	2005 YZ_{158}	—	December 27, 2005	Kitt Peak	Spacewatch	·	2.5 km	MPC · JPL
662318	2005 YD_{159}	—	December 27, 2005	Kitt Peak	Spacewatch	·	1.4 km	MPC · JPL
662319	2005 YF_{161}	—	December 27, 2005	Kitt Peak	Spacewatch	EOS	1.9 km	MPC · JPL
662320	2005 YY_{176}	—	December 22, 2005	Kitt Peak	Spacewatch	·	2.7 km	MPC · JPL
662321	2005 YM_{177}	—	December 1, 2005	Mount Lemmon	Mount Lemmon Survey	VER	2.6 km	MPC · JPL
662322	2005 YG_{183}	—	December 27, 2005	Kitt Peak	Spacewatch	·	1.7 km	MPC · JPL
662323	2005 YL_{183}	—	December 27, 2005	Kitt Peak	Spacewatch	·	2.3 km	MPC · JPL
662324	2005 YR_{196}	—	December 24, 2005	Kitt Peak	Spacewatch	·	780 m	MPC · JPL
662325	2005 YU_{201}	—	November 28, 2005	Mount Lemmon	Mount Lemmon Survey	EUP	4.7 km	MPC · JPL
662326	2005 YY_{203}	—	November 30, 2005	Mount Lemmon	Mount Lemmon Survey	NYS	710 m	MPC · JPL
662327	2005 YD_{213}	—	December 29, 2005	Socorro	LINEAR	·	1.5 km	MPC · JPL
662328	2005 YG_{217}	—	September 11, 2004	Kitt Peak	Spacewatch	·	1.1 km	MPC · JPL
662329	2005 YZ_{224}	—	December 25, 2005	Kitt Peak	Spacewatch	·	820 m	MPC · JPL
662330	2005 YW_{235}	—	December 28, 2005	Kitt Peak	Spacewatch	·	610 m	MPC · JPL
662331	2005 YA_{237}	—	December 28, 2005	Kitt Peak	Spacewatch	·	1.5 km	MPC · JPL
662332	2005 YM_{244}	—	December 30, 2005	Kitt Peak	Spacewatch	·	2.6 km	MPC · JPL
662333	2005 YG_{245}	—	December 30, 2005	Kitt Peak	Spacewatch	·	1.3 km	MPC · JPL
662334	2005 YJ_{247}	—	December 30, 2005	Mount Lemmon	Mount Lemmon Survey	·	1.3 km	MPC · JPL
662335	2005 YW_{247}	—	December 30, 2005	Kitt Peak	Spacewatch	·	3.0 km	MPC · JPL
662336	2005 YA_{250}	—	December 28, 2005	Kitt Peak	Spacewatch	H	350 m	MPC · JPL
662337	2005 YB_{250}	—	July 25, 2014	Haleakala	Pan-STARRS 1	·	1.8 km	MPC · JPL
662338	2005 YF_{252}	—	December 29, 2005	Kitt Peak	Spacewatch	·	2.7 km	MPC · JPL
662339	2005 YJ_{254}	—	November 30, 2005	Mount Lemmon	Mount Lemmon Survey	·	2.9 km	MPC · JPL
662340	2005 YK_{270}	—	September 12, 2004	Kitt Peak	Spacewatch	·	1.6 km	MPC · JPL
662341	2005 YR_{275}	—	November 26, 2005	Kitt Peak	Spacewatch	·	3.1 km	MPC · JPL
662342	2005 YJ_{276}	—	October 27, 2005	Mount Lemmon	Mount Lemmon Survey	KOR	1.5 km	MPC · JPL
662343	2005 YC_{277}	—	December 24, 2005	Kitt Peak	Spacewatch	·	3.4 km	MPC · JPL
662344	2005 YZ_{282}	—	December 27, 2005	Kitt Peak	Spacewatch	·	740 m	MPC · JPL
662345	2005 YP_{286}	—	December 30, 2005	Kitt Peak	Spacewatch	·	810 m	MPC · JPL
662346	2005 YT_{288}	—	October 20, 1993	Kitt Peak	Spacewatch	·	860 m	MPC · JPL
662347	2005 YY_{293}	—	December 28, 2005	Kitt Peak	Spacewatch	(5)	1.1 km	MPC · JPL
662348	2005 YL_{294}	—	December 21, 2005	Kitt Peak	Spacewatch	·	1.5 km	MPC · JPL
662349	2005 YQ_{294}	—	January 29, 2012	Catalina	CSS	·	2.4 km	MPC · JPL
662350	2005 YW_{295}	—	December 25, 2005	Kitt Peak	Spacewatch	(5)	1.1 km	MPC · JPL
662351	2005 YA_{296}	—	December 4, 2015	Haleakala	Pan-STARRS 1	·	1.8 km	MPC · JPL
662352	2005 YU_{298}	—	August 5, 2008	La Sagra	OAM	ADE	1.8 km	MPC · JPL
662353	2005 YW_{298}	—	October 8, 2010	Catalina	CSS	·	2.5 km	MPC · JPL
662354	2005 YV_{299}	—	February 22, 2017	Mount Lemmon	Mount Lemmon Survey	·	610 m	MPC · JPL
662355	2005 YT_{300}	—	December 25, 2005	Kitt Peak	Spacewatch	·	1.7 km	MPC · JPL
662356	2006 AY_{24}	—	December 28, 2005	Mount Lemmon	Mount Lemmon Survey	·	1.5 km	MPC · JPL
662357	2006 AC_{26}	—	January 5, 2006	Kitt Peak	Spacewatch	·	800 m	MPC · JPL
662358	2006 AA_{28}	—	January 5, 2006	Mount Lemmon	Mount Lemmon Survey	JUN	1.1 km	MPC · JPL
662359	2006 AV_{44}	—	January 10, 2006	Wrightwood	J. W. Young	·	910 m	MPC · JPL
662360	2006 AT_{50}	—	December 28, 2005	Kitt Peak	Spacewatch	·	1.5 km	MPC · JPL
662361	2006 AC_{51}	—	January 5, 2006	Kitt Peak	Spacewatch	·	960 m	MPC · JPL
662362	2006 AG_{58}	—	January 8, 2006	Mount Lemmon	Mount Lemmon Survey	·	1.6 km	MPC · JPL
662363	2006 AF_{64}	—	November 29, 2005	Mount Lemmon	Mount Lemmon Survey	·	1.6 km	MPC · JPL
662364	2006 AM_{69}	—	December 30, 2005	Mount Lemmon	Mount Lemmon Survey	·	2.2 km	MPC · JPL
662365	2006 AH_{79}	—	January 6, 2006	Kitt Peak	Spacewatch	·	3.8 km	MPC · JPL
662366	2006 AJ_{80}	—	January 5, 2006	Mount Lemmon	Mount Lemmon Survey	·	1.6 km	MPC · JPL
662367	2006 AY_{87}	—	January 5, 2006	Kitt Peak	Spacewatch	EOS	1.3 km	MPC · JPL
662368	2006 AJ_{94}	—	January 8, 2006	Kitt Peak	Spacewatch	·	870 m	MPC · JPL
662369	2006 AC_{97}	—	September 12, 2013	Mount Lemmon	Mount Lemmon Survey	·	1.3 km	MPC · JPL
662370	2006 AX_{101}	—	March 18, 2002	Kitt Peak	Spacewatch	(13314)	1.8 km	MPC · JPL
662371	2006 AP_{102}	—	October 11, 2004	Kitt Peak	Deep Ecliptic Survey	·	1.4 km	MPC · JPL
662372	2006 AR_{102}	—	January 7, 2006	Mauna Kea	P. A. Wiegert, D. D. Balam	EUN	730 m	MPC · JPL
662373	2006 AW_{105}	—	January 7, 2006	Mount Lemmon	Mount Lemmon Survey	·	890 m	MPC · JPL
662374	2006 AQ_{108}	—	January 10, 2006	Mount Lemmon	Mount Lemmon Survey	·	1 km	MPC · JPL
662375	2006 AT_{108}	—	January 9, 2006	Kitt Peak	Spacewatch	EOS	1.9 km	MPC · JPL
662376	2006 AB_{109}	—	March 29, 2012	Haleakala	Pan-STARRS 1	·	2.2 km	MPC · JPL
662377	2006 AE_{109}	—	December 7, 2013	Nogales	M. Schwartz, P. R. Holvorcem	·	960 m	MPC · JPL
662378	2006 AG_{109}	—	July 27, 2003	Reedy Creek	J. Broughton	·	1.9 km	MPC · JPL
662379	2006 AS_{109}	—	January 5, 2006	Kitt Peak	Spacewatch	·	920 m	MPC · JPL
662380	2006 AG_{110}	—	January 7, 2006	Mount Lemmon	Mount Lemmon Survey	·	830 m	MPC · JPL
662381	2006 AA_{111}	—	December 11, 2012	Mount Lemmon	Mount Lemmon Survey	·	680 m	MPC · JPL
662382	2006 AB_{113}	—	August 14, 2015	Haleakala	Pan-STARRS 1	·	2.9 km	MPC · JPL
662383	2006 AF_{114}	—	September 15, 2009	Mount Lemmon	Mount Lemmon Survey	·	2.6 km	MPC · JPL
662384	2006 AM_{114}	—	March 20, 2017	Haleakala	Pan-STARRS 1	·	730 m	MPC · JPL
662385	2006 BE_{14}	—	January 4, 2006	Mount Lemmon	Mount Lemmon Survey	·	4.0 km	MPC · JPL
662386	2006 BM_{20}	—	January 22, 2006	Mount Lemmon	Mount Lemmon Survey	H	350 m	MPC · JPL
662387	2006 BC_{37}	—	September 19, 2003	Kitt Peak	Spacewatch	·	1.4 km	MPC · JPL
662388	2006 BP_{48}	—	January 25, 2006	Kitt Peak	Spacewatch	·	1.6 km	MPC · JPL
662389	2006 BU_{52}	—	January 25, 2006	Kitt Peak	Spacewatch	EOS	1.7 km	MPC · JPL
662390	2006 BN_{55}	—	January 27, 2006	Socorro	LINEAR	APO	360 m	MPC · JPL
662391	2006 BH_{66}	—	January 23, 2006	Kitt Peak	Spacewatch	·	950 m	MPC · JPL
662392	2006 BY_{70}	—	January 23, 2006	Kitt Peak	Spacewatch	·	880 m	MPC · JPL
662393	2006 BX_{71}	—	January 23, 2006	Kitt Peak	Spacewatch	AGN	1.1 km	MPC · JPL
662394	2006 BU_{73}	—	January 23, 2006	Kitt Peak	Spacewatch	·	1.3 km	MPC · JPL
662395	2006 BT_{97}	—	January 27, 2006	Mount Lemmon	Mount Lemmon Survey	·	740 m	MPC · JPL
662396	2006 BA_{106}	—	July 30, 1995	Kitt Peak	Spacewatch	·	1.3 km	MPC · JPL
662397	2006 BY_{108}	—	January 25, 2006	Kitt Peak	Spacewatch	L5	8.8 km	MPC · JPL
662398	2006 BV_{110}	—	January 25, 2006	Kitt Peak	Spacewatch	EOS	1.5 km	MPC · JPL
662399	2006 BO_{122}	—	January 26, 2006	Kitt Peak	Spacewatch	·	1.8 km	MPC · JPL
662400	2006 BV_{149}	—	January 25, 2006	Catalina	CSS	T_{j} (2.9)	4.2 km	MPC · JPL

== 662401–662500 ==
back to top

Designation			Discovery			Properties		Ref
Permanent	Provisional	Named after	Date	Site	Discoverer(s)	Category	Diam.	Ref
662401	2006 BP_{162}	—	January 26, 2006	Mount Lemmon	Mount Lemmon Survey	·	1.5 km	MPC · JPL
662402	2006 BX_{165}	—	January 26, 2006	Mount Lemmon	Mount Lemmon Survey	·	1.5 km	MPC · JPL
662403	2006 BN_{166}	—	July 24, 2003	Palomar	NEAT	·	1.9 km	MPC · JPL
662404	2006 BZ_{171}	—	January 27, 2006	Kitt Peak	Spacewatch	·	630 m	MPC · JPL
662405	2006 BA_{173}	—	December 25, 2005	Mount Lemmon	Mount Lemmon Survey	·	2.1 km	MPC · JPL
662406	2006 BM_{181}	—	October 6, 2008	Kitt Peak	Spacewatch	·	780 m	MPC · JPL
662407	2006 BN_{198}	—	January 30, 2006	Anderson Mesa	Wasserman, L. H.	ARM	2.6 km	MPC · JPL
662408	2006 BV_{200}	—	January 31, 2006	Kitt Peak	Spacewatch	·	830 m	MPC · JPL
662409	2006 BM_{205}	—	February 6, 1997	Kitt Peak	Spacewatch	·	1.4 km	MPC · JPL
662410	2006 BC_{209}	—	January 26, 2006	Kitt Peak	Spacewatch	·	910 m	MPC · JPL
662411	2006 BG_{224}	—	January 30, 2006	Kitt Peak	Spacewatch	AGN	1.1 km	MPC · JPL
662412	2006 BJ_{234}	—	January 23, 2006	Kitt Peak	Spacewatch	·	3.0 km	MPC · JPL
662413	2006 BM_{235}	—	January 31, 2006	Kitt Peak	Spacewatch	·	2.1 km	MPC · JPL
662414	2006 BG_{246}	—	January 31, 2006	Kitt Peak	Spacewatch	·	1.1 km	MPC · JPL
662415	2006 BU_{246}	—	January 10, 2006	Kitt Peak	Spacewatch	·	1.2 km	MPC · JPL
662416	2006 BN_{248}	—	January 23, 2006	Kitt Peak	Spacewatch	·	1.4 km	MPC · JPL
662417	2006 BG_{261}	—	January 31, 2006	Kitt Peak	Spacewatch	·	580 m	MPC · JPL
662418	2006 BG_{262}	—	January 31, 2006	Kitt Peak	Spacewatch	·	2.3 km	MPC · JPL
662419	2006 BZ_{279}	—	January 23, 2006	Kitt Peak	Spacewatch	·	2.3 km	MPC · JPL
662420	2006 BV_{281}	—	January 23, 2006	Mount Lemmon	Mount Lemmon Survey	·	1.7 km	MPC · JPL
662421	2006 BA_{287}	—	November 12, 2010	Mount Lemmon	Mount Lemmon Survey	·	3.1 km	MPC · JPL
662422	2006 BP_{287}	—	April 13, 2013	Haleakala	Pan-STARRS 1	·	2.8 km	MPC · JPL
662423	2006 BA_{288}	—	January 2, 2012	Kitt Peak	Spacewatch	·	2.4 km	MPC · JPL
662424	2006 BR_{288}	—	January 31, 2006	Kitt Peak	Spacewatch	·	1.7 km	MPC · JPL
662425	2006 BY_{290}	—	January 30, 2006	Kitt Peak	Spacewatch	·	710 m	MPC · JPL
662426	2006 BP_{291}	—	September 25, 2014	Catalina	CSS	·	1.7 km	MPC · JPL
662427	2006 BZ_{292}	—	September 12, 2017	Haleakala	Pan-STARRS 1	·	1.5 km	MPC · JPL
662428	2006 BQ_{295}	—	May 3, 2008	Kitt Peak	Spacewatch	L5	6.9 km	MPC · JPL
662429	2006 BS_{300}	—	January 23, 2006	Kitt Peak	Spacewatch	·	1.6 km	MPC · JPL
662430	2006 BE_{302}	—	January 31, 2006	Kitt Peak	Spacewatch	·	2.7 km	MPC · JPL
662431	2006 CU_{2}	—	January 25, 2006	Kitt Peak	Spacewatch	·	1.6 km	MPC · JPL
662432	2006 CD_{6}	—	February 1, 2006	Mount Lemmon	Mount Lemmon Survey	(5)	830 m	MPC · JPL
662433	2006 CM_{12}	—	February 1, 2006	Kitt Peak	Spacewatch	·	1.3 km	MPC · JPL
662434	2006 CH_{15}	—	January 7, 2006	Kitt Peak	Spacewatch	(5)	860 m	MPC · JPL
662435	2006 CE_{17}	—	February 1, 2006	Mount Lemmon	Mount Lemmon Survey	·	1.4 km	MPC · JPL
662436	2006 CL_{23}	—	January 25, 2006	Mount Lemmon	Mount Lemmon Survey	·	3.2 km	MPC · JPL
662437	2006 CA_{33}	—	February 2, 2006	Kitt Peak	Spacewatch	·	1.6 km	MPC · JPL
662438	2006 CR_{33}	—	January 8, 2006	Mount Lemmon	Mount Lemmon Survey	·	1.7 km	MPC · JPL
662439	2006 CZ_{52}	—	February 4, 2006	Kitt Peak	Spacewatch	·	1.2 km	MPC · JPL
662440	2006 CF_{57}	—	January 26, 2006	Kitt Peak	Spacewatch	·	1.2 km	MPC · JPL
662441	2006 CY_{64}	—	February 2, 2006	Mauna Kea	P. A. Wiegert	T_{j} (2.97)	2.7 km	MPC · JPL
662442	2006 CO_{71}	—	December 23, 2012	Haleakala	Pan-STARRS 1	·	750 m	MPC · JPL
662443	2006 CK_{73}	—	February 3, 2006	Mauna Kea	P. A. Wiegert, R. Rasmussen	·	1.3 km	MPC · JPL
662444	2006 CF_{75}	—	September 21, 2008	Kitt Peak	Spacewatch	·	1.1 km	MPC · JPL
662445	2006 CM_{78}	—	October 4, 2013	Mount Lemmon	Mount Lemmon Survey	·	1.2 km	MPC · JPL
662446	2006 CG_{80}	—	February 2, 2006	Kitt Peak	Spacewatch	T_{j} (2.98) · EUP	2.8 km	MPC · JPL
662447	2006 CN_{80}	—	January 19, 2012	Haleakala	Pan-STARRS 1	VER	2.1 km	MPC · JPL
662448	2006 CG_{81}	—	February 1, 2006	Kitt Peak	Spacewatch	·	980 m	MPC · JPL
662449	2006 CF_{82}	—	February 1, 2006	Mount Lemmon	Mount Lemmon Survey	(3025)	3.2 km	MPC · JPL
662450	2006 CQ_{82}	—	February 2, 2006	Kitt Peak	Spacewatch	H	460 m	MPC · JPL
662451	2006 CA_{84}	—	February 1, 2006	Mount Lemmon	Mount Lemmon Survey	·	720 m	MPC · JPL
662452	2006 CJ_{84}	—	September 28, 1998	Kitt Peak	Spacewatch	·	1.9 km	MPC · JPL
662453	2006 CM_{84}	—	March 24, 2012	Kitt Peak	Spacewatch	·	1.9 km	MPC · JPL
662454	2006 CG_{85}	—	February 2, 2006	Kitt Peak	Spacewatch	L5	7.4 km	MPC · JPL
662455	2006 CT_{85}	—	November 25, 2009	Mount Lemmon	Mount Lemmon Survey	·	1.0 km	MPC · JPL
662456	2006 CS_{88}	—	February 1, 2006	Mount Lemmon	Mount Lemmon Survey	·	1.5 km	MPC · JPL
662457	2006 CG_{89}	—	February 1, 2006	Kitt Peak	Spacewatch	L5	8.0 km	MPC · JPL
662458	2006 CR_{90}	—	February 2, 2006	Kitt Peak	Spacewatch	EUN	860 m	MPC · JPL
662459	2006 DH_{3}	—	February 20, 2006	Kitt Peak	Spacewatch	·	2.3 km	MPC · JPL
662460	2006 DR_{45}	—	January 26, 2006	Kitt Peak	Spacewatch	·	1.3 km	MPC · JPL
662461	2006 DX_{49}	—	January 26, 2006	Anderson Mesa	LONEOS	EUP	3.3 km	MPC · JPL
662462	2006 DR_{53}	—	February 24, 2006	Mount Lemmon	Mount Lemmon Survey	·	770 m	MPC · JPL
662463	2006 DE_{57}	—	February 24, 2006	Kitt Peak	Spacewatch	AGN	1.0 km	MPC · JPL
662464	2006 DM_{76}	—	February 24, 2006	Kitt Peak	Spacewatch	·	1.3 km	MPC · JPL
662465	2006 DJ_{77}	—	January 23, 2006	Mount Lemmon	Mount Lemmon Survey	NYS	750 m	MPC · JPL
662466	2006 DA_{85}	—	February 24, 2006	Kitt Peak	Spacewatch	·	1.4 km	MPC · JPL
662467	2006 DW_{104}	—	August 23, 2003	Palomar	NEAT	·	1.1 km	MPC · JPL
662468	2006 DB_{113}	—	February 27, 2006	Kitt Peak	Spacewatch	·	2.4 km	MPC · JPL
662469	2006 DT_{116}	—	February 27, 2006	Catalina	CSS	·	3.7 km	MPC · JPL
662470	2006 DD_{126}	—	February 2, 2006	Mount Lemmon	Mount Lemmon Survey	·	760 m	MPC · JPL
662471	2006 DJ_{126}	—	February 25, 2006	Kitt Peak	Spacewatch	·	930 m	MPC · JPL
662472	2006 DN_{134}	—	February 25, 2006	Kitt Peak	Spacewatch	EOS	1.4 km	MPC · JPL
662473	2006 DW_{147}	—	February 25, 2006	Kitt Peak	Spacewatch	THM	2.3 km	MPC · JPL
662474	2006 DT_{148}	—	February 25, 2006	Kitt Peak	Spacewatch	·	910 m	MPC · JPL
662475	2006 DW_{151}	—	August 24, 2003	Palomar	NEAT	EUN	1.3 km	MPC · JPL
662476	2006 DY_{156}	—	February 27, 2006	Mount Lemmon	Mount Lemmon Survey	·	2.3 km	MPC · JPL
662477	2006 DM_{158}	—	February 27, 2006	Kitt Peak	Spacewatch	·	1.6 km	MPC · JPL
662478	2006 DU_{161}	—	September 29, 2003	Kitt Peak	Spacewatch	·	1.9 km	MPC · JPL
662479	2006 DR_{163}	—	February 27, 2006	Mount Lemmon	Mount Lemmon Survey	·	2.4 km	MPC · JPL
662480	2006 DK_{167}	—	February 27, 2006	Kitt Peak	Spacewatch	L5	8.2 km	MPC · JPL
662481	2006 DU_{169}	—	February 20, 2006	Kitt Peak	Spacewatch	MAS	580 m	MPC · JPL
662482	2006 DN_{182}	—	February 27, 2006	Mount Lemmon	Mount Lemmon Survey	·	1.8 km	MPC · JPL
662483	2006 DA_{220}	—	September 23, 2008	Mount Lemmon	Mount Lemmon Survey	WIT	870 m	MPC · JPL
662484	2006 DS_{220}	—	August 20, 2014	Haleakala	Pan-STARRS 1	EOS	1.7 km	MPC · JPL
662485	2006 DW_{221}	—	November 9, 2009	Mount Lemmon	Mount Lemmon Survey	·	2.4 km	MPC · JPL
662486	2006 DT_{222}	—	December 13, 2017	Mount Lemmon	Mount Lemmon Survey	·	4.5 km	MPC · JPL
662487	2006 DU_{222}	—	July 30, 2008	Kitt Peak	Spacewatch	·	2.7 km	MPC · JPL
662488	2006 DN_{224}	—	September 19, 2011	Mount Lemmon	Mount Lemmon Survey	V	560 m	MPC · JPL
662489	2006 EL_{6}	—	January 30, 2006	Kitt Peak	Spacewatch	·	1.5 km	MPC · JPL
662490	2006 EO_{6}	—	January 31, 2006	Kitt Peak	Spacewatch	·	1.2 km	MPC · JPL
662491	2006 ED_{12}	—	March 2, 2006	Kitt Peak	Spacewatch	·	2.6 km	MPC · JPL
662492	2006 EQ_{13}	—	March 2, 2006	Kitt Peak	Spacewatch	·	1.9 km	MPC · JPL
662493	2006 EQ_{15}	—	March 2, 2006	Kitt Peak	Spacewatch	·	900 m	MPC · JPL
662494	2006 EH_{20}	—	January 30, 2006	Kitt Peak	Spacewatch	·	1.2 km	MPC · JPL
662495	2006 EX_{24}	—	October 29, 1998	Kitt Peak	Spacewatch	·	2.4 km	MPC · JPL
662496	2006 EM_{26}	—	January 9, 2006	Kitt Peak	Spacewatch	·	3.1 km	MPC · JPL
662497	2006 EP_{28}	—	January 26, 2006	Mount Lemmon	Mount Lemmon Survey	·	1.5 km	MPC · JPL
662498	2006 EJ_{30}	—	November 21, 2004	Campo Imperatore	CINEOS	·	2.0 km	MPC · JPL
662499	2006 EP_{31}	—	March 3, 2006	Kitt Peak	Spacewatch	·	1.4 km	MPC · JPL
662500	2006 EU_{42}	—	March 4, 2006	Kitt Peak	Spacewatch	·	830 m	MPC · JPL

== 662501–662600 ==
back to top

Designation			Discovery			Properties		Ref
Permanent	Provisional	Named after	Date	Site	Discoverer(s)	Category	Diam.	Ref
662501	2006 ES_{49}	—	September 30, 2003	Kitt Peak	Spacewatch	·	2.1 km	MPC · JPL
662502	2006 EL_{50}	—	March 4, 2006	Kitt Peak	Spacewatch	·	1.2 km	MPC · JPL
662503	2006 EW_{50}	—	March 4, 2006	Kitt Peak	Spacewatch	·	1.2 km	MPC · JPL
662504	2006 EB_{54}	—	March 4, 2006	Kitt Peak	Spacewatch	·	2.2 km	MPC · JPL
662505	2006 EO_{55}	—	March 5, 2006	Kitt Peak	Spacewatch	NYS	780 m	MPC · JPL
662506	2006 EA_{61}	—	September 30, 2003	Kitt Peak	Spacewatch	VER	2.8 km	MPC · JPL
662507	2006 EL_{69}	—	March 3, 2006	Kitt Peak	Spacewatch	NYS	700 m	MPC · JPL
662508	2006 EJ_{70}	—	September 21, 2003	Kitt Peak	Spacewatch	EOS	2.1 km	MPC · JPL
662509	2006 EW_{74}	—	February 7, 2006	Mount Lemmon	Mount Lemmon Survey	·	1.0 km	MPC · JPL
662510	2006 EX_{76}	—	July 30, 2008	Kitt Peak	Spacewatch	·	1.6 km	MPC · JPL
662511	2006 EB_{77}	—	January 1, 2014	Mount Lemmon	Mount Lemmon Survey	·	970 m	MPC · JPL
662512	2006 EJ_{77}	—	November 27, 2013	Haleakala	Pan-STARRS 1	NEM	1.8 km	MPC · JPL
662513	2006 EM_{77}	—	January 1, 2014	Haleakala	Pan-STARRS 1	·	1.4 km	MPC · JPL
662514	2006 EP_{77}	—	January 2, 2009	Kitt Peak	Spacewatch	·	1.1 km	MPC · JPL
662515	2006 EU_{78}	—	July 30, 2008	Kitt Peak	Spacewatch	·	1.2 km	MPC · JPL
662516	2006 EV_{78}	—	August 24, 2007	Kitt Peak	Spacewatch	MAS	620 m	MPC · JPL
662517	2006 EE_{79}	—	March 5, 2006	Kitt Peak	Spacewatch	·	1.2 km	MPC · JPL
662518	2006 EU_{79}	—	March 4, 2006	Mount Lemmon	Mount Lemmon Survey	H	390 m	MPC · JPL
662519	2006 EH_{80}	—	August 21, 2008	Kitt Peak	Spacewatch	AGN	910 m	MPC · JPL
662520	2006 EA_{81}	—	November 13, 2015	Mount Lemmon	Mount Lemmon Survey	·	840 m	MPC · JPL
662521	2006 EJ_{81}	—	September 5, 2008	Kitt Peak	Spacewatch	·	1.4 km	MPC · JPL
662522	2006 FW_{6}	—	March 23, 2006	Mount Lemmon	Mount Lemmon Survey	·	2.7 km	MPC · JPL
662523	2006 FP_{23}	—	March 24, 2006	Kitt Peak	Spacewatch	·	860 m	MPC · JPL
662524	2006 FW_{26}	—	March 24, 2006	Mount Lemmon	Mount Lemmon Survey	·	1.4 km	MPC · JPL
662525	2006 FE_{29}	—	March 24, 2006	Mount Lemmon	Mount Lemmon Survey	·	1.4 km	MPC · JPL
662526	2006 FR_{33}	—	March 25, 2006	Mount Lemmon	Mount Lemmon Survey	·	1.2 km	MPC · JPL
662527	2006 FX_{55}	—	February 24, 2006	Kitt Peak	Spacewatch	·	890 m	MPC · JPL
662528	2006 FB_{57}	—	November 8, 2013	Mount Lemmon	Mount Lemmon Survey	·	1.5 km	MPC · JPL
662529	2006 FW_{58}	—	March 19, 2017	Haleakala	Pan-STARRS 1	THM	1.7 km	MPC · JPL
662530	2006 GR_{1}	—	March 4, 2006	Catalina	CSS	H	490 m	MPC · JPL
662531	2006 GD_{10}	—	September 17, 2003	Palomar	NEAT	ADE	1.9 km	MPC · JPL
662532	2006 GF_{16}	—	April 2, 2006	Kitt Peak	Spacewatch	·	3.4 km	MPC · JPL
662533	2006 GB_{17}	—	April 2, 2006	Kitt Peak	Spacewatch	V	540 m	MPC · JPL
662534	2006 GM_{17}	—	April 2, 2006	Kitt Peak	Spacewatch	NYS	850 m	MPC · JPL
662535	2006 GJ_{34}	—	April 7, 2006	Kitt Peak	Spacewatch	·	1.5 km	MPC · JPL
662536	2006 GN_{56}	—	September 17, 2010	Mount Lemmon	Mount Lemmon Survey	·	850 m	MPC · JPL
662537	2006 HR_{8}	—	April 7, 2006	Mount Lemmon	Mount Lemmon Survey	H	450 m	MPC · JPL
662538	2006 HQ_{9}	—	April 19, 2006	Kitt Peak	Spacewatch	·	2.5 km	MPC · JPL
662539	2006 HB_{14}	—	April 9, 2006	Kitt Peak	Spacewatch	LIX	2.9 km	MPC · JPL
662540	2006 HK_{14}	—	March 25, 2006	Kitt Peak	Spacewatch	AGN	1.0 km	MPC · JPL
662541	2006 HT_{49}	—	April 25, 2006	Kitt Peak	Spacewatch	H	390 m	MPC · JPL
662542	2006 HC_{61}	—	April 29, 2006	Siding Spring	SSS	·	1.7 km	MPC · JPL
662543	2006 HW_{68}	—	March 6, 2011	Mount Lemmon	Mount Lemmon Survey	·	2.5 km	MPC · JPL
662544	2006 HE_{71}	—	April 25, 2006	Kitt Peak	Spacewatch	·	930 m	MPC · JPL
662545	2006 HO_{84}	—	April 26, 2006	Kitt Peak	Spacewatch	·	1.4 km	MPC · JPL
662546	2006 HZ_{101}	—	April 30, 2006	Kitt Peak	Spacewatch	·	1.1 km	MPC · JPL
662547	2006 HJ_{105}	—	April 25, 2006	Catalina	CSS	·	3.3 km	MPC · JPL
662548	2006 HC_{109}	—	April 30, 2006	Kitt Peak	Spacewatch	·	1.4 km	MPC · JPL
662549	2006 HR_{112}	—	April 25, 2006	Mount Lemmon	Mount Lemmon Survey	·	1.5 km	MPC · JPL
662550	2006 HR_{113}	—	April 25, 2006	Kitt Peak	Spacewatch	·	1.9 km	MPC · JPL
662551	2006 HS_{113}	—	April 21, 2006	Kitt Peak	Spacewatch	·	3.5 km	MPC · JPL
662552	2006 HE_{118}	—	April 29, 2006	Kitt Peak	Spacewatch	·	2.7 km	MPC · JPL
662553	2006 HF_{119}	—	April 30, 2006	Kitt Peak	Spacewatch	·	630 m	MPC · JPL
662554	2006 HL_{124}	—	April 26, 2006	Mount Lemmon	Mount Lemmon Survey	·	1.4 km	MPC · JPL
662555	2006 HQ_{128}	—	February 2, 2006	Kitt Peak	Spacewatch	V	530 m	MPC · JPL
662556	2006 HY_{128}	—	April 26, 2006	Cerro Tololo	Deep Ecliptic Survey	·	1.2 km	MPC · JPL
662557	2006 HE_{129}	—	April 26, 2006	Cerro Tololo	Deep Ecliptic Survey	·	1.2 km	MPC · JPL
662558	2006 HL_{129}	—	April 26, 2006	Cerro Tololo	Deep Ecliptic Survey	HYG	2.2 km	MPC · JPL
662559	2006 HR_{130}	—	May 26, 2003	Kitt Peak	Spacewatch	(5)	1.3 km	MPC · JPL
662560	2006 HN_{144}	—	April 27, 2006	Cerro Tololo	Deep Ecliptic Survey	THM	2.6 km	MPC · JPL
662561	2006 HS_{155}	—	October 3, 2013	Haleakala	Pan-STARRS 1	·	2.7 km	MPC · JPL
662562	2006 HZ_{155}	—	December 8, 2015	Haleakala	Pan-STARRS 1	THM	1.6 km	MPC · JPL
662563	2006 HL_{156}	—	August 26, 2012	Haleakala	Pan-STARRS 1	·	1.0 km	MPC · JPL
662564	2006 JF	—	May 1, 2006	Socorro	LINEAR	APO	430 m	MPC · JPL
662565	2006 JR_{19}	—	April 20, 2006	Kitt Peak	Spacewatch	·	910 m	MPC · JPL
662566	2006 JA_{26}	—	May 2, 2006	Wrightwood	J. W. Young	·	1.1 km	MPC · JPL
662567	2006 JP_{43}	—	May 5, 2006	Kitt Peak	Spacewatch	ARM	3.4 km	MPC · JPL
662568	2006 JT_{62}	—	March 2, 2006	Kitt Peak	Spacewatch	DOR	2.4 km	MPC · JPL
662569	2006 JW_{71}	—	May 1, 2006	Mauna Kea	P. A. Wiegert	·	960 m	MPC · JPL
662570	2006 JR_{76}	—	May 1, 2006	Mauna Kea	P. A. Wiegert	·	760 m	MPC · JPL
662571	2006 JC_{77}	—	May 1, 2006	Mauna Kea	P. A. Wiegert	·	3.3 km	MPC · JPL
662572	2006 JY_{86}	—	May 5, 2006	Kitt Peak	Spacewatch	·	400 m	MPC · JPL
662573	2006 JB_{87}	—	November 8, 2007	Kitt Peak	Spacewatch	MAS	670 m	MPC · JPL
662574	2006 JD_{88}	—	May 2, 2006	Mount Lemmon	Mount Lemmon Survey	HOF	2.3 km	MPC · JPL
662575	2006 JF_{88}	—	May 2, 2006	Mount Lemmon	Mount Lemmon Survey	·	1.4 km	MPC · JPL
662576	2006 KH_{5}	—	May 19, 2006	Mount Lemmon	Mount Lemmon Survey	NEM	2.6 km	MPC · JPL
662577	2006 KU_{14}	—	May 20, 2006	Kitt Peak	Spacewatch	THM	2.1 km	MPC · JPL
662578	2006 KQ_{29}	—	May 20, 2006	Kitt Peak	Spacewatch	·	2.8 km	MPC · JPL
662579	2006 KZ_{31}	—	May 20, 2006	Kitt Peak	Spacewatch	·	2.6 km	MPC · JPL
662580	2006 KK_{33}	—	May 20, 2006	Kitt Peak	Spacewatch	MRX	930 m	MPC · JPL
662581	2006 KS_{34}	—	May 6, 2006	Mount Lemmon	Mount Lemmon Survey	·	2.4 km	MPC · JPL
662582	2006 KT_{34}	—	May 6, 2006	Mount Lemmon	Mount Lemmon Survey	(5)	1.1 km	MPC · JPL
662583	2006 KQ_{37}	—	May 23, 2006	Kitt Peak	Spacewatch	·	2.3 km	MPC · JPL
662584	2006 KR_{43}	—	May 9, 2006	Mount Lemmon	Mount Lemmon Survey	·	2.2 km	MPC · JPL
662585	2006 KZ_{44}	—	May 21, 2006	Kitt Peak	Spacewatch	·	970 m	MPC · JPL
662586	2006 KB_{53}	—	May 21, 2006	Kitt Peak	Spacewatch	·	1.8 km	MPC · JPL
662587	2006 KC_{59}	—	May 22, 2006	Kitt Peak	Spacewatch	·	3.3 km	MPC · JPL
662588	2006 KO_{61}	—	May 22, 2006	Kitt Peak	Spacewatch	·	2.8 km	MPC · JPL
662589	2006 KS_{70}	—	May 22, 2006	Kitt Peak	Spacewatch	·	2.1 km	MPC · JPL
662590	2006 KX_{78}	—	May 24, 2006	Mount Lemmon	Mount Lemmon Survey	·	2.3 km	MPC · JPL
662591	2006 KB_{91}	—	April 24, 1995	Kitt Peak	Spacewatch	TIR	2.9 km	MPC · JPL
662592	2006 KL_{98}	—	May 26, 2006	Kitt Peak	Spacewatch	·	2.7 km	MPC · JPL
662593	2006 KJ_{101}	—	May 25, 2006	Kitt Peak	Spacewatch	·	2.9 km	MPC · JPL
662594	2006 KR_{102}	—	May 28, 2006	Kitt Peak	Spacewatch	·	1.5 km	MPC · JPL
662595	2006 KL_{116}	—	May 29, 2006	Kitt Peak	Spacewatch	·	1.5 km	MPC · JPL
662596	2006 KD_{118}	—	May 1, 2006	Catalina	CSS	·	1.8 km	MPC · JPL
662597	2006 KJ_{126}	—	March 9, 2005	Mount Lemmon	Mount Lemmon Survey	THM	2.5 km	MPC · JPL
662598	2006 KV_{126}	—	May 25, 2006	Mauna Kea	P. A. Wiegert	·	840 m	MPC · JPL
662599	2006 KO_{129}	—	May 25, 2006	Mauna Kea	P. A. Wiegert	·	1.4 km	MPC · JPL
662600	2006 KZ_{140}	—	May 20, 2006	Mount Lemmon	Mount Lemmon Survey	NYS	910 m	MPC · JPL

== 662601–662700 ==
back to top

Designation			Discovery			Properties		Ref
Permanent	Provisional	Named after	Date	Site	Discoverer(s)	Category	Diam.	Ref
662601	2006 KS_{142}	—	May 23, 2006	Mount Lemmon	Mount Lemmon Survey	·	2.1 km	MPC · JPL
662602	2006 KO_{144}	—	October 23, 2003	Kitt Peak	Deep Ecliptic Survey	·	1.5 km	MPC · JPL
662603	2006 KA_{146}	—	May 21, 2006	Mount Lemmon	Mount Lemmon Survey	·	1.0 km	MPC · JPL
662604	2006 KU_{146}	—	December 22, 2008	Kitt Peak	Spacewatch	·	2.0 km	MPC · JPL
662605	2006 KT_{148}	—	May 24, 2006	Kitt Peak	Spacewatch	·	4.1 km	MPC · JPL
662606	2006 KM_{151}	—	December 27, 2013	Mount Lemmon	Mount Lemmon Survey	·	1.9 km	MPC · JPL
662607 Cosialls	2006 LG_{8}	Cosialls	November 3, 2008	Mount Lemmon	Mount Lemmon Survey	·	3.3 km	MPC · JPL
662608	2006 LP_{9}	—	February 18, 2015	Haleakala	Pan-STARRS 1	·	1.6 km	MPC · JPL
662609	2006 MK_{15}	—	June 19, 2006	Mount Lemmon	Mount Lemmon Survey	·	1.0 km	MPC · JPL
662610	2006 MR_{15}	—	June 17, 2006	Kitt Peak	Spacewatch	·	3.3 km	MPC · JPL
662611	2006 OP_{8}	—	July 21, 2006	Mount Lemmon	Mount Lemmon Survey	·	660 m	MPC · JPL
662612	2006 OR_{14}	—	July 26, 2006	Pla D'Arguines	R. Ferrando, Ferrando, M.	EUN	1.3 km	MPC · JPL
662613	2006 OK_{17}	—	July 25, 2006	Charleston	R. Holmes	·	1.5 km	MPC · JPL
662614	2006 OA_{24}	—	November 1, 2007	Mount Lemmon	Mount Lemmon Survey	KOR	1.2 km	MPC · JPL
662615	2006 OJ_{40}	—	June 8, 2016	Mount Lemmon	Mount Lemmon Survey	·	2.0 km	MPC · JPL
662616	2006 PX_{14}	—	August 17, 2006	Palomar	NEAT	·	490 m	MPC · JPL
662617	2006 PP_{17}	—	August 15, 2006	Lulin	LUSS	·	1.6 km	MPC · JPL
662618	2006 PR_{24}	—	August 12, 2006	Palomar	NEAT	·	940 m	MPC · JPL
662619	2006 PW_{27}	—	August 14, 2006	Siding Spring	SSS	·	1.2 km	MPC · JPL
662620	2006 PJ_{34}	—	August 15, 2006	Palomar	NEAT	·	1.1 km	MPC · JPL
662621	2006 PW_{35}	—	August 12, 2006	Palomar	NEAT	·	1.1 km	MPC · JPL
662622	2006 QV	—	August 7, 2006	Pla D'Arguines	R. Ferrando, Ferrando, M.	·	1.8 km	MPC · JPL
662623	2006 QW_{4}	—	August 19, 2006	Pla D'Arguines	R. Ferrando, Ferrando, M.	·	1.8 km	MPC · JPL
662624	2006 QX_{8}	—	August 19, 2006	Kitt Peak	Spacewatch	ULA	4.0 km	MPC · JPL
662625	2006 QY_{10}	—	August 21, 2006	Pla D'Arguines	R. Ferrando, Ferrando, M.	·	1.3 km	MPC · JPL
662626	2006 QN_{11}	—	August 16, 2006	Siding Spring	SSS	·	990 m	MPC · JPL
662627	2006 QZ_{15}	—	August 17, 2006	Palomar	NEAT	·	790 m	MPC · JPL
662628	2006 QD_{16}	—	August 17, 2006	Palomar	NEAT	NYS	1 km	MPC · JPL
662629	2006 QY_{19}	—	August 18, 2006	Socorro	LINEAR	T_{j} (2.94)	5.3 km	MPC · JPL
662630	2006 QM_{24}	—	October 31, 2002	Apache Point	SDSS Collaboration	·	2.1 km	MPC · JPL
662631	2006 QL_{34}	—	August 19, 2006	Kitt Peak	Spacewatch	·	700 m	MPC · JPL
662632	2006 QS_{36}	—	October 28, 2010	Mount Lemmon	Mount Lemmon Survey	NYS	1.0 km	MPC · JPL
662633	2006 QX_{41}	—	August 17, 2006	Palomar	NEAT	·	1.7 km	MPC · JPL
662634	2006 QP_{47}	—	August 20, 2006	Palomar	NEAT	·	1.9 km	MPC · JPL
662635	2006 QB_{54}	—	August 16, 2006	Siding Spring	SSS	·	1.0 km	MPC · JPL
662636	2006 QP_{61}	—	August 22, 2006	Palomar	NEAT	·	1.0 km	MPC · JPL
662637	2006 QU_{62}	—	August 23, 2006	Palomar	NEAT	·	1.4 km	MPC · JPL
662638	2006 QZ_{66}	—	August 21, 2006	Kitt Peak	Spacewatch	V	540 m	MPC · JPL
662639	2006 QH_{69}	—	August 21, 2006	Kitt Peak	Spacewatch	·	3.5 km	MPC · JPL
662640	2006 QR_{75}	—	August 21, 2006	Kitt Peak	Spacewatch	KOR	1.2 km	MPC · JPL
662641	2006 QS_{77}	—	August 22, 2006	Palomar	NEAT	NYS	1.1 km	MPC · JPL
662642	2006 QY_{77}	—	August 22, 2006	Palomar	NEAT	·	780 m	MPC · JPL
662643	2006 QA_{79}	—	August 23, 2006	Palomar	NEAT	KOR	1.8 km	MPC · JPL
662644	2006 QN_{86}	—	August 19, 2006	Kitt Peak	Spacewatch	KOR	1.1 km	MPC · JPL
662645	2006 QU_{94}	—	August 19, 2006	Kitt Peak	Spacewatch	·	640 m	MPC · JPL
662646	2006 QJ_{95}	—	August 20, 2006	Palomar	NEAT	·	1.8 km	MPC · JPL
662647	2006 QM_{96}	—	August 20, 2006	Palomar	NEAT	·	3.5 km	MPC · JPL
662648	2006 QA_{99}	—	August 22, 2006	Palomar	NEAT	·	680 m	MPC · JPL
662649	2006 QB_{106}	—	August 28, 2006	Catalina	CSS	·	690 m	MPC · JPL
662650	2006 QD_{122}	—	August 21, 2006	Kitt Peak	Spacewatch	·	1.2 km	MPC · JPL
662651	2006 QO_{125}	—	August 25, 2006	Socorro	LINEAR	H	540 m	MPC · JPL
662652	2006 QK_{129}	—	August 17, 2006	Palomar	NEAT	·	1.9 km	MPC · JPL
662653	2006 QY_{130}	—	August 20, 2006	Palomar	NEAT	·	1.8 km	MPC · JPL
662654	2006 QS_{131}	—	August 22, 2006	Palomar	NEAT	·	2.0 km	MPC · JPL
662655	2006 QT_{136}	—	August 19, 2006	Anderson Mesa	LONEOS	·	1.4 km	MPC · JPL
662656	2006 QK_{141}	—	August 19, 2006	Palomar	NEAT	·	1.9 km	MPC · JPL
662657	2006 QD_{149}	—	August 18, 2006	Kitt Peak	Spacewatch	·	2.1 km	MPC · JPL
662658	2006 QD_{156}	—	August 19, 2006	Kitt Peak	Spacewatch	·	1.2 km	MPC · JPL
662659	2006 QA_{159}	—	April 2, 2005	Mount Lemmon	Mount Lemmon Survey	·	960 m	MPC · JPL
662660	2006 QP_{188}	—	August 29, 2006	Catalina	CSS	·	540 m	MPC · JPL
662661	2006 QU_{188}	—	November 14, 2010	Catalina	CSS	·	1.0 km	MPC · JPL
662662	2006 QQ_{189}	—	December 28, 2007	Kitt Peak	Spacewatch	·	1.5 km	MPC · JPL
662663	2006 QZ_{189}	—	August 23, 2011	Mayhill-ISON	L. Elenin	TEL	1.1 km	MPC · JPL
662664	2006 QJ_{191}	—	August 19, 2006	Kitt Peak	Spacewatch	·	1.2 km	MPC · JPL
662665	2006 QR_{191}	—	August 28, 2006	Kitt Peak	Spacewatch	·	1.7 km	MPC · JPL
662666	2006 QA_{193}	—	August 29, 2006	Kitt Peak	Spacewatch	·	1.6 km	MPC · JPL
662667	2006 QZ_{194}	—	August 17, 2006	Palomar	NEAT	·	1.0 km	MPC · JPL
662668	2006 QM_{196}	—	August 28, 2016	Mount Lemmon	Mount Lemmon Survey	KOR	1.3 km	MPC · JPL
662669	2006 QO_{196}	—	March 22, 2009	Mount Lemmon	Mount Lemmon Survey	·	990 m	MPC · JPL
662670	2006 QH_{200}	—	September 21, 2011	Haleakala	Pan-STARRS 1	·	1.6 km	MPC · JPL
662671	2006 QN_{200}	—	November 6, 2016	Mount Lemmon	Mount Lemmon Survey	·	470 m	MPC · JPL
662672	2006 QK_{202}	—	August 29, 2006	Kitt Peak	Spacewatch	·	1.8 km	MPC · JPL
662673	2006 QV_{203}	—	August 28, 2006	Kitt Peak	Spacewatch	·	1.6 km	MPC · JPL
662674	2006 QC_{206}	—	August 17, 2006	Palomar	NEAT	·	1.0 km	MPC · JPL
662675	2006 RP_{2}	—	May 16, 2013	Haleakala	Pan-STARRS 1	MAS	660 m	MPC · JPL
662676	2006 RK_{11}	—	August 29, 2006	Catalina	CSS	·	2.5 km	MPC · JPL
662677	2006 RM_{11}	—	August 17, 2006	Palomar	NEAT	·	1.5 km	MPC · JPL
662678	2006 RO_{14}	—	September 14, 2006	Kitt Peak	Spacewatch	·	1.5 km	MPC · JPL
662679	2006 RB_{15}	—	September 14, 2006	Kitt Peak	Spacewatch	·	1.3 km	MPC · JPL
662680	2006 RA_{16}	—	September 14, 2006	Palomar	NEAT	AEO	1.2 km	MPC · JPL
662681	2006 RW_{17}	—	August 29, 2006	Anderson Mesa	LONEOS	·	2.0 km	MPC · JPL
662682	2006 RJ_{25}	—	September 14, 2006	Kitt Peak	Spacewatch	·	1.4 km	MPC · JPL
662683	2006 RR_{26}	—	September 14, 2006	Kitt Peak	Spacewatch	·	1.6 km	MPC · JPL
662684	2006 RU_{31}	—	September 15, 2006	Kitt Peak	Spacewatch	·	880 m	MPC · JPL
662685	2006 RG_{37}	—	September 12, 2006	Catalina	CSS	·	1.1 km	MPC · JPL
662686	2006 RY_{40}	—	September 14, 2006	Kitt Peak	Spacewatch	EUN	920 m	MPC · JPL
662687	2006 RP_{43}	—	September 14, 2006	Kitt Peak	Spacewatch	·	770 m	MPC · JPL
662688	2006 RO_{48}	—	September 14, 2006	Kitt Peak	Spacewatch	·	2.0 km	MPC · JPL
662689	2006 RY_{51}	—	September 14, 2006	Kitt Peak	Spacewatch	·	880 m	MPC · JPL
662690	2006 RB_{68}	—	September 15, 2006	Kitt Peak	Spacewatch	NYS	1.1 km	MPC · JPL
662691	2006 RC_{69}	—	September 15, 2006	Kitt Peak	Spacewatch	·	1.4 km	MPC · JPL
662692	2006 RQ_{73}	—	September 15, 2006	Kitt Peak	Spacewatch	KOR	1.1 km	MPC · JPL
662693	2006 RW_{87}	—	September 15, 2006	Kitt Peak	Spacewatch	KOR	1.2 km	MPC · JPL
662694	2006 RP_{88}	—	September 15, 2006	Kitt Peak	Spacewatch	·	1.9 km	MPC · JPL
662695	2006 RV_{103}	—	September 15, 2006	Kitt Peak	Spacewatch	TIR	2.1 km	MPC · JPL
662696	2006 RN_{106}	—	September 26, 2006	Kitt Peak	Spacewatch	·	1.8 km	MPC · JPL
662697	2006 RV_{108}	—	October 19, 2006	Mount Lemmon	Mount Lemmon Survey	·	1.6 km	MPC · JPL
662698	2006 RR_{109}	—	September 14, 2006	Mauna Kea	Masiero, J., R. Jedicke	·	490 m	MPC · JPL
662699	2006 RN_{110}	—	September 15, 2006	Kitt Peak	Spacewatch	·	1.1 km	MPC · JPL
662700	2006 RR_{111}	—	September 25, 2006	Mount Lemmon	Mount Lemmon Survey	·	1.6 km	MPC · JPL

== 662701–662800 ==
back to top

Designation			Discovery			Properties		Ref
Permanent	Provisional	Named after	Date	Site	Discoverer(s)	Category	Diam.	Ref
662701	2006 RO_{116}	—	September 25, 2006	Mount Lemmon	Mount Lemmon Survey	GEF	810 m	MPC · JPL
662702	2006 RP_{117}	—	September 14, 2006	Mauna Kea	Masiero, J., R. Jedicke	KOR	1.3 km	MPC · JPL
662703	2006 RQ_{119}	—	September 25, 2006	Kitt Peak	Spacewatch	·	1.4 km	MPC · JPL
662704	2006 RG_{123}	—	September 15, 2006	Kitt Peak	Spacewatch	·	2.4 km	MPC · JPL
662705	2006 RX_{124}	—	September 15, 2006	Kitt Peak	Spacewatch	·	1.4 km	MPC · JPL
662706	2006 SA	—	August 27, 2006	Anderson Mesa	LONEOS	·	350 m	MPC · JPL
662707	2006 SA_{4}	—	September 16, 2006	Catalina	CSS	·	2.4 km	MPC · JPL
662708	2006 SS_{13}	—	September 17, 2006	Socorro	LINEAR	·	1.9 km	MPC · JPL
662709	2006 SC_{16}	—	September 17, 2006	Catalina	CSS	·	900 m	MPC · JPL
662710	2006 SY_{18}	—	September 17, 2006	Kitt Peak	Spacewatch	·	590 m	MPC · JPL
662711	2006 SD_{22}	—	September 17, 2006	Catalina	CSS	·	850 m	MPC · JPL
662712	2006 SE_{26}	—	September 16, 2006	Catalina	CSS	DOR	2.3 km	MPC · JPL
662713	2006 SE_{35}	—	September 17, 2006	Kitt Peak	Spacewatch	·	1.5 km	MPC · JPL
662714	2006 SA_{37}	—	June 17, 2002	Palomar	NEAT	·	1.1 km	MPC · JPL
662715	2006 SZ_{53}	—	August 10, 2006	Palomar	NEAT	·	2.5 km	MPC · JPL
662716	2006 SQ_{55}	—	September 18, 2006	Catalina	CSS	ERI	1.4 km	MPC · JPL
662717	2006 SG_{66}	—	February 14, 2004	Kitt Peak	Spacewatch	·	2.0 km	MPC · JPL
662718	2006 SF_{69}	—	September 19, 2006	Kitt Peak	Spacewatch	·	420 m	MPC · JPL
662719	2006 SH_{73}	—	September 19, 2006	Kitt Peak	Spacewatch	·	1.5 km	MPC · JPL
662720	2006 SX_{73}	—	September 19, 2006	Kitt Peak	Spacewatch	·	1.8 km	MPC · JPL
662721	2006 SX_{79}	—	September 18, 2006	Catalina	CSS	·	2.0 km	MPC · JPL
662722	2006 SR_{81}	—	September 18, 2006	Kitt Peak	Spacewatch	·	1.6 km	MPC · JPL
662723	2006 SK_{91}	—	September 18, 2006	Kitt Peak	Spacewatch	H	440 m	MPC · JPL
662724	2006 SZ_{94}	—	September 18, 2006	Kitt Peak	Spacewatch	·	530 m	MPC · JPL
662725	2006 SB_{109}	—	September 19, 2006	Kitt Peak	Spacewatch	·	690 m	MPC · JPL
662726	2006 SW_{112}	—	March 13, 2005	Catalina	CSS	·	680 m	MPC · JPL
662727	2006 SS_{116}	—	September 19, 2006	Kitt Peak	Spacewatch	·	610 m	MPC · JPL
662728	2006 SW_{116}	—	September 24, 2006	Kitt Peak	Spacewatch	·	1.8 km	MPC · JPL
662729	2006 SM_{119}	—	September 18, 2006	Catalina	CSS	·	1.5 km	MPC · JPL
662730	2006 SR_{123}	—	September 19, 2006	Catalina	CSS	·	2.5 km	MPC · JPL
662731	2006 SB_{126}	—	September 20, 2006	Anderson Mesa	LONEOS	·	820 m	MPC · JPL
662732	2006 SZ_{127}	—	September 17, 2006	Catalina	CSS	·	1.5 km	MPC · JPL
662733	2006 SG_{129}	—	September 18, 2006	Anderson Mesa	LONEOS	·	1.6 km	MPC · JPL
662734	2006 SZ_{130}	—	September 24, 2006	Kitt Peak	Spacewatch	·	1.0 km	MPC · JPL
662735	2006 SB_{139}	—	September 21, 2006	Anderson Mesa	LONEOS	·	1.6 km	MPC · JPL
662736	2006 SX_{139}	—	September 22, 2006	Catalina	CSS	·	2.2 km	MPC · JPL
662737	2006 SR_{141}	—	September 25, 2006	Anderson Mesa	LONEOS	·	690 m	MPC · JPL
662738	2006 SU_{141}	—	September 26, 2006	Eskridge	G. Hug	·	2.1 km	MPC · JPL
662739	2006 SC_{147}	—	September 19, 2006	Kitt Peak	Spacewatch	·	1.4 km	MPC · JPL
662740	2006 SA_{153}	—	September 20, 2006	Palomar	NEAT	·	590 m	MPC · JPL
662741	2006 SJ_{164}	—	August 29, 2006	Kitt Peak	Spacewatch	·	1.8 km	MPC · JPL
662742	2006 SF_{166}	—	December 18, 2001	Apache Point	SDSS Collaboration	·	2.9 km	MPC · JPL
662743	2006 SH_{166}	—	September 25, 2006	Kitt Peak	Spacewatch	·	840 m	MPC · JPL
662744	2006 SR_{173}	—	September 25, 2006	Mount Lemmon	Mount Lemmon Survey	·	1.0 km	MPC · JPL
662745	2006 SW_{182}	—	September 18, 2006	Kitt Peak	Spacewatch	·	780 m	MPC · JPL
662746	2006 SU_{187}	—	September 18, 2006	Kitt Peak	Spacewatch	·	1.4 km	MPC · JPL
662747	2006 SA_{191}	—	September 26, 2006	Mount Lemmon	Mount Lemmon Survey	·	1.6 km	MPC · JPL
662748	2006 SC_{191}	—	September 26, 2006	Mount Lemmon	Mount Lemmon Survey	·	740 m	MPC · JPL
662749	2006 SW_{201}	—	September 24, 2006	Kitt Peak	Spacewatch	·	510 m	MPC · JPL
662750	2006 SF_{203}	—	September 25, 2006	Mount Lemmon	Mount Lemmon Survey	·	850 m	MPC · JPL
662751	2006 SY_{215}	—	September 27, 2006	Kitt Peak	Spacewatch	·	570 m	MPC · JPL
662752	2006 SW_{233}	—	September 26, 2006	Kitt Peak	Spacewatch	·	1.1 km	MPC · JPL
662753	2006 SL_{239}	—	September 26, 2006	Kitt Peak	Spacewatch	·	1.8 km	MPC · JPL
662754	2006 SC_{251}	—	September 26, 2006	Kitt Peak	Spacewatch	·	650 m	MPC · JPL
662755	2006 SD_{251}	—	September 19, 2006	Kitt Peak	Spacewatch	·	1.2 km	MPC · JPL
662756	2006 SL_{254}	—	September 26, 2006	Mount Lemmon	Mount Lemmon Survey	NYS	820 m	MPC · JPL
662757	2006 SO_{258}	—	September 26, 2006	Kitt Peak	Spacewatch	NAE	1.9 km	MPC · JPL
662758	2006 SR_{258}	—	September 19, 2006	Kitt Peak	Spacewatch	·	500 m	MPC · JPL
662759	2006 SE_{262}	—	September 26, 2006	Mount Lemmon	Mount Lemmon Survey	·	480 m	MPC · JPL
662760	2006 SH_{268}	—	September 26, 2006	Kitt Peak	Spacewatch	·	440 m	MPC · JPL
662761	2006 ST_{269}	—	September 26, 2006	Mount Lemmon	Mount Lemmon Survey	·	2.6 km	MPC · JPL
662762	2006 SV_{270}	—	September 16, 2006	Palomar	NEAT	·	1.2 km	MPC · JPL
662763	2006 SQ_{286}	—	September 21, 2006	Anderson Mesa	LONEOS	·	1.5 km	MPC · JPL
662764	2006 SH_{291}	—	January 7, 2016	Haleakala	Pan-STARRS 1	MAR	1.0 km	MPC · JPL
662765	2006 SO_{291}	—	September 17, 2006	Catalina	CSS	·	1.4 km	MPC · JPL
662766	2006 SJ_{297}	—	September 25, 2006	Kitt Peak	Spacewatch	·	550 m	MPC · JPL
662767	2006 SZ_{300}	—	September 17, 2006	Kitt Peak	Spacewatch	·	1.7 km	MPC · JPL
662768	2006 SG_{303}	—	September 27, 2006	Kitt Peak	Spacewatch	·	770 m	MPC · JPL
662769	2006 SZ_{307}	—	September 17, 2006	Kitt Peak	Spacewatch	·	1.1 km	MPC · JPL
662770	2006 SE_{326}	—	September 19, 2006	Kitt Peak	Spacewatch	·	820 m	MPC · JPL
662771	2006 SK_{329}	—	September 14, 2006	Kitt Peak	Spacewatch	EOS	1.5 km	MPC · JPL
662772	2006 SY_{333}	—	September 28, 2006	Kitt Peak	Spacewatch	KOR	1.5 km	MPC · JPL
662773	2006 SB_{340}	—	September 28, 2006	Kitt Peak	Spacewatch	·	530 m	MPC · JPL
662774	2006 SK_{345}	—	September 28, 2006	Kitt Peak	Spacewatch	·	1.7 km	MPC · JPL
662775	2006 SQ_{345}	—	September 28, 2006	Kitt Peak	Spacewatch	·	590 m	MPC · JPL
662776	2006 SQ_{347}	—	September 28, 2006	Kitt Peak	Spacewatch	·	530 m	MPC · JPL
662777	2006 SU_{358}	—	September 30, 2006	Catalina	CSS	NYS	930 m	MPC · JPL
662778	2006 SY_{358}	—	August 10, 2001	Palomar	NEAT	·	1.7 km	MPC · JPL
662779	2006 SJ_{363}	—	September 30, 2006	Mount Lemmon	Mount Lemmon Survey	·	2.3 km	MPC · JPL
662780	2006 SU_{370}	—	September 6, 2011	Haleakala	Pan-STARRS 1	·	1.4 km	MPC · JPL
662781	2006 ST_{374}	—	September 16, 2006	Apache Point	SDSS Collaboration	·	480 m	MPC · JPL
662782	2006 SO_{375}	—	October 1, 2006	Kitt Peak	Spacewatch	T_{j} (2.99) · 3:2	5.2 km	MPC · JPL
662783	2006 SV_{375}	—	September 17, 2006	Apache Point	SDSS Collaboration	·	1.4 km	MPC · JPL
662784	2006 SS_{377}	—	September 17, 2006	Apache Point	SDSS Collaboration	·	3.1 km	MPC · JPL
662785	2006 SQ_{385}	—	September 29, 2006	Apache Point	SDSS Collaboration	·	3.7 km	MPC · JPL
662786	2006 SS_{386}	—	September 29, 2006	Apache Point	SDSS Collaboration	·	840 m	MPC · JPL
662787	2006 SU_{386}	—	September 29, 2006	Apache Point	SDSS Collaboration	·	840 m	MPC · JPL
662788	2006 SC_{387}	—	September 26, 2006	Mount Lemmon	Mount Lemmon Survey	T_{j} (2.98) · 3:2	3.4 km	MPC · JPL
662789	2006 SQ_{388}	—	September 19, 2006	Apache Point	SDSS Collaboration	·	780 m	MPC · JPL
662790	2006 SV_{388}	—	September 30, 2006	Apache Point	SDSS Collaboration	·	1.7 km	MPC · JPL
662791	2006 SG_{390}	—	October 28, 2006	Catalina	CSS	·	900 m	MPC · JPL
662792	2006 SF_{399}	—	September 17, 2006	Kitt Peak	Spacewatch	·	2.1 km	MPC · JPL
662793	2006 SW_{401}	—	September 17, 2006	Kitt Peak	Spacewatch	·	2.3 km	MPC · JPL
662794	2006 SW_{409}	—	September 16, 2006	Kitt Peak	Spacewatch	EOS	1.4 km	MPC · JPL
662795	2006 SJ_{410}	—	September 17, 2006	Kitt Peak	Spacewatch	·	1.7 km	MPC · JPL
662796	2006 SJ_{412}	—	September 27, 2006	Mount Lemmon	Mount Lemmon Survey	3:2	3.8 km	MPC · JPL
662797	2006 SW_{415}	—	September 18, 2006	Anderson Mesa	LONEOS	·	1.5 km	MPC · JPL
662798	2006 SX_{419}	—	May 17, 2009	Kitt Peak	Spacewatch	·	2.0 km	MPC · JPL
662799	2006 SC_{423}	—	September 25, 2006	Mount Lemmon	Mount Lemmon Survey	·	1.7 km	MPC · JPL
662800	2006 SS_{424}	—	September 18, 2006	Anderson Mesa	LONEOS	·	1.2 km	MPC · JPL

== 662801–662900 ==
back to top

Designation			Discovery			Properties		Ref
Permanent	Provisional	Named after	Date	Site	Discoverer(s)	Category	Diam.	Ref
662801	2006 SQ_{426}	—	December 18, 2007	Mount Lemmon	Mount Lemmon Survey	·	1.7 km	MPC · JPL
662802	2006 SC_{427}	—	September 17, 2006	Kitt Peak	Spacewatch	·	600 m	MPC · JPL
662803	2006 SQ_{428}	—	September 19, 2006	Kitt Peak	Spacewatch	·	1.8 km	MPC · JPL
662804	2006 SU_{432}	—	September 17, 2006	Kitt Peak	Spacewatch	·	490 m	MPC · JPL
662805	2006 SG_{433}	—	September 18, 2006	Kitt Peak	Spacewatch	·	1.6 km	MPC · JPL
662806	2006 ST_{434}	—	September 17, 2006	Kitt Peak	Spacewatch	·	580 m	MPC · JPL
662807	2006 SC_{435}	—	July 30, 2014	Haleakala	Pan-STARRS 1	EUN	730 m	MPC · JPL
662808	2006 SD_{435}	—	July 27, 2009	Kitt Peak	Spacewatch	·	860 m	MPC · JPL
662809	2006 SO_{435}	—	October 7, 2012	Haleakala	Pan-STARRS 1	·	2.4 km	MPC · JPL
662810	2006 SB_{436}	—	September 15, 2006	Kitt Peak	Spacewatch	·	550 m	MPC · JPL
662811	2006 SQ_{436}	—	September 28, 2006	Kitt Peak	Spacewatch	·	510 m	MPC · JPL
662812	2006 SJ_{442}	—	September 25, 2006	Catalina	CSS	·	1.5 km	MPC · JPL
662813	2006 SQ_{442}	—	September 18, 2006	Kitt Peak	Spacewatch	·	470 m	MPC · JPL
662814	2006 SR_{448}	—	September 19, 2006	Kitt Peak	Spacewatch	·	1.5 km	MPC · JPL
662815	2006 SJ_{450}	—	September 27, 2006	Kitt Peak	Spacewatch	·	1.6 km	MPC · JPL
662816	2006 SF_{458}	—	October 6, 1996	Kitt Peak	Spacewatch	·	1.5 km	MPC · JPL
662817	2006 TQ_{1}	—	October 1, 2006	Kitt Peak	Spacewatch	PHO	740 m	MPC · JPL
662818	2006 TV_{2}	—	October 2, 2006	Mount Lemmon	Mount Lemmon Survey	·	830 m	MPC · JPL
662819	2006 TF_{3}	—	September 18, 2006	Catalina	CSS	·	2.1 km	MPC · JPL
662820	2006 TN_{3}	—	September 28, 2006	Kitt Peak	Spacewatch	TEL	940 m	MPC · JPL
662821	2006 TT_{3}	—	October 2, 2006	Mount Lemmon	Mount Lemmon Survey	·	1.5 km	MPC · JPL
662822	2006 TW_{11}	—	October 14, 2006	Piszkéstető	K. Sárneczky, Kuli, Z.	·	480 m	MPC · JPL
662823	2006 TV_{15}	—	October 1, 2006	Kitt Peak	Spacewatch	·	1.5 km	MPC · JPL
662824	2006 TS_{23}	—	October 11, 2006	Kitt Peak	Spacewatch	·	1.8 km	MPC · JPL
662825	2006 TV_{23}	—	September 30, 2006	Mount Lemmon	Mount Lemmon Survey	·	760 m	MPC · JPL
662826	2006 TM_{32}	—	September 26, 2006	Mount Lemmon	Mount Lemmon Survey	·	1.5 km	MPC · JPL
662827	2006 TF_{37}	—	September 30, 2006	Mount Lemmon	Mount Lemmon Survey	·	920 m	MPC · JPL
662828	2006 TA_{45}	—	October 12, 2006	Kitt Peak	Spacewatch	·	880 m	MPC · JPL
662829	2006 TG_{47}	—	October 12, 2006	Kitt Peak	Spacewatch	·	820 m	MPC · JPL
662830	2006 TK_{59}	—	October 4, 2006	Mount Lemmon	Mount Lemmon Survey	·	2.3 km	MPC · JPL
662831	2006 TR_{60}	—	October 14, 2006	Bergisch Gladbach	W. Bickel	EOS	1.4 km	MPC · JPL
662832	2006 TL_{64}	—	October 11, 2006	Kitt Peak	Spacewatch	·	1.5 km	MPC · JPL
662833	2006 TV_{65}	—	October 12, 2006	Palomar	NEAT	H	420 m	MPC · JPL
662834	2006 TP_{76}	—	October 12, 2006	Palomar	NEAT	·	2.0 km	MPC · JPL
662835	2006 TF_{80}	—	October 13, 2006	Kitt Peak	Spacewatch	·	600 m	MPC · JPL
662836	2006 TJ_{81}	—	October 13, 2006	Kitt Peak	Spacewatch	·	760 m	MPC · JPL
662837	2006 TR_{81}	—	October 4, 2006	Mount Lemmon	Mount Lemmon Survey	·	510 m	MPC · JPL
662838	2006 TU_{81}	—	September 27, 2006	Mount Lemmon	Mount Lemmon Survey	·	2.4 km	MPC · JPL
662839	2006 TV_{81}	—	October 13, 2006	Kitt Peak	Spacewatch	·	2.2 km	MPC · JPL
662840	2006 TD_{98}	—	October 1, 2006	Kitt Peak	Spacewatch	·	1.1 km	MPC · JPL
662841	2006 TO_{100}	—	October 2, 2006	Mount Lemmon	Mount Lemmon Survey	·	420 m	MPC · JPL
662842	2006 TA_{111}	—	October 4, 2006	Mount Lemmon	Mount Lemmon Survey	·	1.2 km	MPC · JPL
662843	2006 TU_{113}	—	October 11, 2006	Palomar	NEAT	DOR	2.2 km	MPC · JPL
662844	2006 TL_{114}	—	September 18, 2006	Apache Point	SDSS Collaboration	EOS	1.7 km	MPC · JPL
662845	2006 TP_{114}	—	September 19, 2006	Apache Point	SDSS Collaboration	EOS	1.4 km	MPC · JPL
662846	2006 TJ_{116}	—	September 11, 2006	Apache Point	SDSS Collaboration	·	1.4 km	MPC · JPL
662847	2006 TG_{118}	—	September 29, 2006	Apache Point	SDSS Collaboration	(18466)	2.3 km	MPC · JPL
662848	2006 TX_{125}	—	October 13, 2006	Kitt Peak	Spacewatch	·	1.4 km	MPC · JPL
662849	2006 TE_{130}	—	September 28, 2006	Catalina	CSS	·	990 m	MPC · JPL
662850	2006 TX_{130}	—	September 26, 2006	Catalina	CSS	·	590 m	MPC · JPL
662851	2006 TA_{131}	—	October 2, 2006	Mount Lemmon	Mount Lemmon Survey	H	390 m	MPC · JPL
662852	2006 TF_{134}	—	September 3, 2000	Kitt Peak	Spacewatch	·	3.5 km	MPC · JPL
662853	2006 TQ_{134}	—	March 27, 2014	Haleakala	Pan-STARRS 1	·	1.9 km	MPC · JPL
662854	2006 TD_{135}	—	October 2, 2006	Mount Lemmon	Mount Lemmon Survey	·	1.8 km	MPC · JPL
662855	2006 TN_{135}	—	September 19, 2006	Catalina	CSS	·	580 m	MPC · JPL
662856	2006 TR_{135}	—	October 2, 2006	Mount Lemmon	Mount Lemmon Survey	·	1.3 km	MPC · JPL
662857	2006 TJ_{136}	—	October 1, 2006	Kitt Peak	Spacewatch	·	920 m	MPC · JPL
662858	2006 TL_{136}	—	May 21, 2015	Haleakala	Pan-STARRS 1	·	420 m	MPC · JPL
662859	2006 TV_{140}	—	October 4, 2006	Mount Lemmon	Mount Lemmon Survey	·	1.6 km	MPC · JPL
662860	2006 TA_{142}	—	September 17, 2006	Catalina	CSS	·	1 km	MPC · JPL
662861	2006 UM_{2}	—	April 26, 2004	Mauna Kea	P. A. Wiegert, D. D. Balam	·	1.7 km	MPC · JPL
662862	2006 UM_{30}	—	September 25, 2006	Kitt Peak	Spacewatch	·	790 m	MPC · JPL
662863	2006 US_{31}	—	September 26, 2006	Mount Lemmon	Mount Lemmon Survey	·	1.1 km	MPC · JPL
662864	2006 UX_{32}	—	October 16, 2006	Kitt Peak	Spacewatch	·	510 m	MPC · JPL
662865	2006 US_{42}	—	October 16, 2006	Kitt Peak	Spacewatch	MAS	730 m	MPC · JPL
662866	2006 UX_{46}	—	October 16, 2006	Kitt Peak	Spacewatch	·	1.4 km	MPC · JPL
662867	2006 UB_{48}	—	August 25, 2006	Lulin	LUSS	·	1.8 km	MPC · JPL
662868	2006 UH_{51}	—	October 11, 2006	Kitt Peak	Spacewatch	·	1.4 km	MPC · JPL
662869	2006 UX_{52}	—	October 2, 2006	Mount Lemmon	Mount Lemmon Survey	·	1.7 km	MPC · JPL
662870	2006 UG_{63}	—	October 11, 2006	Palomar	NEAT	·	1.1 km	MPC · JPL
662871	2006 US_{64}	—	October 17, 2006	Mount Lemmon	Mount Lemmon Survey	·	1.6 km	MPC · JPL
662872	2006 UM_{68}	—	September 26, 2006	Mount Lemmon	Mount Lemmon Survey	·	1.4 km	MPC · JPL
662873	2006 US_{77}	—	September 27, 2006	Mount Lemmon	Mount Lemmon Survey	EOS	1.5 km	MPC · JPL
662874	2006 UC_{82}	—	October 17, 2006	Kitt Peak	Spacewatch	PHO	780 m	MPC · JPL
662875	2006 UF_{82}	—	October 3, 2006	Mount Lemmon	Mount Lemmon Survey	·	1.7 km	MPC · JPL
662876	2006 UR_{91}	—	September 20, 2006	Kitt Peak	Spacewatch	·	1.7 km	MPC · JPL
662877	2006 UM_{98}	—	October 3, 2006	Mount Lemmon	Mount Lemmon Survey	·	2.1 km	MPC · JPL
662878	2006 US_{99}	—	October 18, 2006	Kitt Peak	Spacewatch	TIR	1.9 km	MPC · JPL
662879	2006 UE_{102}	—	October 18, 2006	Kitt Peak	Spacewatch	·	580 m	MPC · JPL
662880	2006 UG_{104}	—	May 7, 2005	Mount Lemmon	Mount Lemmon Survey	·	870 m	MPC · JPL
662881	2006 UP_{104}	—	October 18, 2006	Kitt Peak	Spacewatch	·	1.6 km	MPC · JPL
662882	2006 UO_{109}	—	September 27, 2006	Catalina	CSS	·	2.2 km	MPC · JPL
662883	2006 UN_{110}	—	October 19, 2006	Kitt Peak	Spacewatch	·	800 m	MPC · JPL
662884	2006 UJ_{114}	—	October 19, 2006	Kitt Peak	Spacewatch	·	1.8 km	MPC · JPL
662885	2006 UU_{115}	—	October 2, 2006	Kitt Peak	Spacewatch	NYS	800 m	MPC · JPL
662886	2006 UF_{124}	—	October 2, 2006	Kitt Peak	Spacewatch	·	470 m	MPC · JPL
662887	2006 UX_{124}	—	August 12, 2006	Palomar	NEAT	·	2.7 km	MPC · JPL
662888	2006 UV_{141}	—	October 19, 2006	Kitt Peak	Spacewatch	·	3.4 km	MPC · JPL
662889	2006 UG_{153}	—	October 21, 2006	Kitt Peak	Spacewatch	·	940 m	MPC · JPL
662890	2006 UW_{155}	—	October 21, 2006	Mount Lemmon	Mount Lemmon Survey	·	1.8 km	MPC · JPL
662891	2006 UX_{156}	—	October 10, 2006	Palomar	NEAT	PHO	950 m	MPC · JPL
662892	2006 UA_{158}	—	October 21, 2006	Mount Lemmon	Mount Lemmon Survey	·	870 m	MPC · JPL
662893	2006 UD_{165}	—	October 2, 2006	Mount Lemmon	Mount Lemmon Survey	·	630 m	MPC · JPL
662894	2006 UE_{169}	—	October 21, 2006	Mount Lemmon	Mount Lemmon Survey	·	1.0 km	MPC · JPL
662895	2006 UX_{171}	—	October 21, 2006	Mount Lemmon	Mount Lemmon Survey	·	1.7 km	MPC · JPL
662896	2006 UN_{183}	—	September 26, 2006	Catalina	CSS	·	2.4 km	MPC · JPL
662897	2006 UG_{192}	—	October 11, 2006	Palomar	NEAT	·	2.4 km	MPC · JPL
662898	2006 UJ_{195}	—	September 26, 2006	Mount Lemmon	Mount Lemmon Survey	·	1.5 km	MPC · JPL
662899	2006 UH_{196}	—	October 20, 2006	Kitt Peak	Spacewatch	·	460 m	MPC · JPL
662900	2006 UA_{199}	—	October 20, 2006	Kitt Peak	Spacewatch	THM	1.6 km	MPC · JPL

== 662901–663000 ==
back to top

Designation			Discovery			Properties		Ref
Permanent	Provisional	Named after	Date	Site	Discoverer(s)	Category	Diam.	Ref
662901	2006 UR_{203}	—	September 17, 2006	Catalina	CSS	·	1.3 km	MPC · JPL
662902	2006 UQ_{206}	—	September 26, 2006	Mount Lemmon	Mount Lemmon Survey	·	860 m	MPC · JPL
662903	2006 UQ_{220}	—	October 2, 2006	Kitt Peak	Spacewatch	·	2.2 km	MPC · JPL
662904	2006 UD_{223}	—	October 17, 2006	Catalina	CSS	·	660 m	MPC · JPL
662905	2006 UM_{224}	—	October 19, 2006	Mount Lemmon	Mount Lemmon Survey	·	2.1 km	MPC · JPL
662906	2006 UG_{227}	—	September 26, 2006	Kitt Peak	Spacewatch	·	1.8 km	MPC · JPL
662907	2006 UJ_{228}	—	October 23, 2006	Palomar	NEAT	·	1.7 km	MPC · JPL
662908	2006 UK_{230}	—	October 2, 2006	Mount Lemmon	Mount Lemmon Survey	·	2.1 km	MPC · JPL
662909	2006 UU_{231}	—	October 11, 2006	Palomar	NEAT	H	470 m	MPC · JPL
662910	2006 UE_{235}	—	October 11, 2006	Kitt Peak	Spacewatch	·	1.6 km	MPC · JPL
662911	2006 UO_{236}	—	October 3, 2006	Kitt Peak	Spacewatch	·	650 m	MPC · JPL
662912	2006 UT_{238}	—	October 4, 2006	Mount Lemmon	Mount Lemmon Survey	EUP	2.6 km	MPC · JPL
662913	2006 UG_{243}	—	November 21, 1995	Kitt Peak	Spacewatch	·	1.1 km	MPC · JPL
662914	2006 UU_{250}	—	September 26, 2006	Mount Lemmon	Mount Lemmon Survey	·	1.7 km	MPC · JPL
662915	2006 UX_{253}	—	October 27, 2006	Mount Lemmon	Mount Lemmon Survey	PAD	1.5 km	MPC · JPL
662916	2006 UT_{256}	—	September 18, 2006	Kitt Peak	Spacewatch	·	1.7 km	MPC · JPL
662917	2006 UE_{268}	—	October 16, 2006	Kitt Peak	Spacewatch	·	1.6 km	MPC · JPL
662918	2006 UX_{268}	—	July 2, 2005	Kitt Peak	Spacewatch	·	2.4 km	MPC · JPL
662919	2006 UL_{273}	—	October 27, 2006	Kitt Peak	Spacewatch	(5)	830 m	MPC · JPL
662920	2006 UV_{277}	—	October 28, 2006	Kitt Peak	Spacewatch	·	540 m	MPC · JPL
662921	2006 UQ_{285}	—	October 20, 2006	Kitt Peak	Spacewatch	·	1.4 km	MPC · JPL
662922	2006 UT_{285}	—	October 28, 2006	Kitt Peak	Spacewatch	·	1.2 km	MPC · JPL
662923	2006 UW_{285}	—	September 30, 2006	Mount Lemmon	Mount Lemmon Survey	·	2.0 km	MPC · JPL
662924	2006 UW_{287}	—	October 29, 2006	Kitt Peak	Spacewatch	·	570 m	MPC · JPL
662925	2006 UJ_{290}	—	October 31, 2006	Kitt Peak	Spacewatch	·	2.1 km	MPC · JPL
662926	2006 UC_{294}	—	October 19, 2006	Kitt Peak	Deep Ecliptic Survey	KOR	1.2 km	MPC · JPL
662927	2006 UQ_{296}	—	September 25, 2006	Mount Lemmon	Mount Lemmon Survey	KOR	1.5 km	MPC · JPL
662928	2006 UR_{317}	—	November 23, 2006	Kitt Peak	Spacewatch	·	2.3 km	MPC · JPL
662929	2006 UU_{350}	—	April 10, 2005	Mount Lemmon	Mount Lemmon Survey	·	490 m	MPC · JPL
662930	2006 UD_{361}	—	October 19, 2006	Catalina	CSS	JUN	970 m	MPC · JPL
662931	2006 UD_{364}	—	October 20, 2006	Mount Lemmon	Mount Lemmon Survey	·	540 m	MPC · JPL
662932	2006 UY_{364}	—	October 22, 2006	Catalina	CSS	·	750 m	MPC · JPL
662933	2006 UY_{365}	—	October 16, 2006	Catalina	CSS	·	780 m	MPC · JPL
662934	2006 UC_{367}	—	September 24, 2006	Kitt Peak	Spacewatch	·	590 m	MPC · JPL
662935	2006 UK_{367}	—	September 6, 2016	Mount Lemmon	Mount Lemmon Survey	·	2.0 km	MPC · JPL
662936	2006 UO_{367}	—	October 23, 2006	Kitt Peak	Spacewatch	·	2.4 km	MPC · JPL
662937	2006 UB_{371}	—	October 19, 2006	Kitt Peak	Spacewatch	·	800 m	MPC · JPL
662938	2006 UC_{373}	—	September 24, 2006	Kitt Peak	Spacewatch	·	670 m	MPC · JPL
662939	2006 UA_{374}	—	October 21, 2006	Mount Lemmon	Mount Lemmon Survey	EOS	1.6 km	MPC · JPL
662940	2006 UL_{375}	—	June 26, 2015	Haleakala	Pan-STARRS 1	KOR	1.2 km	MPC · JPL
662941	2006 UF_{376}	—	January 10, 2014	Mount Lemmon	Mount Lemmon Survey	·	520 m	MPC · JPL
662942	2006 UL_{376}	—	October 19, 2006	Kitt Peak	Spacewatch	·	1.2 km	MPC · JPL
662943	2006 UU_{382}	—	October 28, 2006	Kitt Peak	Spacewatch	·	590 m	MPC · JPL
662944	2006 UZ_{382}	—	October 29, 2006	Mount Lemmon	Mount Lemmon Survey	·	1.1 km	MPC · JPL
662945	2006 UQ_{386}	—	October 21, 2006	Mount Lemmon	Mount Lemmon Survey	·	440 m	MPC · JPL
662946	2006 UC_{388}	—	October 19, 2006	Mount Lemmon	Mount Lemmon Survey	·	1.5 km	MPC · JPL
662947	2006 UT_{390}	—	October 22, 2006	Kitt Peak	Spacewatch	NYS	1.1 km	MPC · JPL
662948	2006 VT_{11}	—	October 21, 2006	Kitt Peak	Spacewatch	·	1.8 km	MPC · JPL
662949	2006 VQ_{21}	—	October 27, 2006	Mount Lemmon	Mount Lemmon Survey	·	1.5 km	MPC · JPL
662950	2006 VB_{32}	—	September 30, 2006	Mount Lemmon	Mount Lemmon Survey	AGN	1.2 km	MPC · JPL
662951	2006 VL_{32}	—	September 28, 2006	Mount Lemmon	Mount Lemmon Survey	·	530 m	MPC · JPL
662952	2006 VB_{36}	—	November 11, 2006	Mount Lemmon	Mount Lemmon Survey	·	2.2 km	MPC · JPL
662953	2006 VC_{36}	—	July 15, 2005	Mount Lemmon	Mount Lemmon Survey	THM	2.0 km	MPC · JPL
662954	2006 VW_{36}	—	October 19, 2006	Catalina	CSS	·	580 m	MPC · JPL
662955	2006 VS_{39}	—	October 31, 2006	Mount Lemmon	Mount Lemmon Survey	·	1.4 km	MPC · JPL
662956	2006 VY_{39}	—	September 25, 2006	Mount Lemmon	Mount Lemmon Survey	·	1.2 km	MPC · JPL
662957	2006 VJ_{51}	—	November 10, 2006	Kitt Peak	Spacewatch	·	950 m	MPC · JPL
662958	2006 VK_{51}	—	November 10, 2006	Kitt Peak	Spacewatch	·	1.6 km	MPC · JPL
662959	2006 VT_{57}	—	October 22, 2006	Mount Lemmon	Mount Lemmon Survey	T_{j} (2.97) · 3:2	4.3 km	MPC · JPL
662960	2006 VM_{59}	—	November 11, 2006	Kitt Peak	Spacewatch	·	1.6 km	MPC · JPL
662961	2006 VH_{61}	—	November 11, 2006	Kitt Peak	Spacewatch	·	840 m	MPC · JPL
662962	2006 VF_{66}	—	October 21, 2006	Mount Lemmon	Mount Lemmon Survey	GEF	1.3 km	MPC · JPL
662963	2006 VV_{70}	—	July 5, 2006	Mauna Kea	D. J. Tholen	·	1.9 km	MPC · JPL
662964	2006 VB_{73}	—	November 11, 2006	Catalina	CSS	·	2.1 km	MPC · JPL
662965	2006 VD_{74}	—	November 11, 2006	Kitt Peak	Spacewatch	HNS	1.1 km	MPC · JPL
662966	2006 VN_{74}	—	November 11, 2006	Mount Lemmon	Mount Lemmon Survey	EOS	1.2 km	MPC · JPL
662967	2006 VS_{74}	—	November 11, 2006	Mount Lemmon	Mount Lemmon Survey	·	1.8 km	MPC · JPL
662968	2006 VF_{79}	—	October 3, 2006	Mount Lemmon	Mount Lemmon Survey	·	810 m	MPC · JPL
662969	2006 VH_{80}	—	November 12, 2006	Mount Lemmon	Mount Lemmon Survey	·	520 m	MPC · JPL
662970	2006 VL_{83}	—	November 13, 2006	Kitt Peak	Spacewatch	EOS	1.6 km	MPC · JPL
662971	2006 VD_{86}	—	September 25, 2006	Mount Lemmon	Mount Lemmon Survey	·	580 m	MPC · JPL
662972	2006 VE_{87}	—	November 14, 2006	Catalina	CSS	·	950 m	MPC · JPL
662973	2006 VU_{89}	—	November 14, 2006	Kitt Peak	Spacewatch	·	1.6 km	MPC · JPL
662974	2006 VJ_{91}	—	November 14, 2006	Mount Lemmon	Mount Lemmon Survey	HOF	2.1 km	MPC · JPL
662975	2006 VX_{99}	—	October 31, 2006	Mount Lemmon	Mount Lemmon Survey	·	560 m	MPC · JPL
662976	2006 VK_{100}	—	October 19, 2006	Mount Lemmon	Mount Lemmon Survey	·	2.2 km	MPC · JPL
662977	2006 VJ_{105}	—	October 17, 2006	Mount Lemmon	Mount Lemmon Survey	3:2 · SHU	4.4 km	MPC · JPL
662978	2006 VU_{107}	—	October 17, 2006	Mount Lemmon	Mount Lemmon Survey	·	2.1 km	MPC · JPL
662979	2006 VT_{115}	—	November 14, 2006	Kitt Peak	Spacewatch	·	910 m	MPC · JPL
662980	2006 VU_{115}	—	November 14, 2006	Kitt Peak	Spacewatch	·	1.5 km	MPC · JPL
662981	2006 VW_{119}	—	November 14, 2006	Mount Lemmon	Mount Lemmon Survey	·	1.1 km	MPC · JPL
662982	2006 VK_{125}	—	October 20, 2006	Mount Lemmon	Mount Lemmon Survey	EOS	1.7 km	MPC · JPL
662983	2006 VF_{131}	—	October 31, 2006	Mount Lemmon	Mount Lemmon Survey	·	1.2 km	MPC · JPL
662984	2006 VD_{132}	—	November 15, 2006	Kitt Peak	Spacewatch	·	1.5 km	MPC · JPL
662985	2006 VG_{137}	—	September 28, 2006	Mount Lemmon	Mount Lemmon Survey	·	490 m	MPC · JPL
662986	2006 VN_{138}	—	October 21, 2006	Mount Lemmon	Mount Lemmon Survey	·	1.7 km	MPC · JPL
662987	2006 VT_{147}	—	November 15, 2006	Kitt Peak	Spacewatch	EOS	1.3 km	MPC · JPL
662988	2006 VE_{172}	—	November 15, 2006	Mount Lemmon	Mount Lemmon Survey	·	1.3 km	MPC · JPL
662989	2006 VK_{173}	—	November 11, 2006	Mount Lemmon	Mount Lemmon Survey	·	1.4 km	MPC · JPL
662990	2006 VK_{175}	—	November 2, 2006	Mount Lemmon	Mount Lemmon Survey	·	2.3 km	MPC · JPL
662991	2006 VM_{176}	—	February 18, 2008	Mount Lemmon	Mount Lemmon Survey	·	1.8 km	MPC · JPL
662992	2006 VP_{176}	—	November 15, 2006	Vail-Jarnac	Jarnac	·	910 m	MPC · JPL
662993	2006 VH_{179}	—	September 16, 2009	Mount Lemmon	Mount Lemmon Survey	·	570 m	MPC · JPL
662994	2006 VN_{182}	—	November 14, 2006	Kitt Peak	Spacewatch	·	1.8 km	MPC · JPL
662995	2006 VC_{183}	—	November 15, 2006	Mount Lemmon	Mount Lemmon Survey	·	2.3 km	MPC · JPL
662996	2006 VB_{187}	—	November 11, 2006	Kitt Peak	Spacewatch	TIR	2.0 km	MPC · JPL
662997	2006 VF_{187}	—	November 15, 2006	Mount Lemmon	Mount Lemmon Survey	·	2.0 km	MPC · JPL
662998	2006 WG_{1}	—	November 17, 2006	Catalina	CSS	H	390 m	MPC · JPL
662999	2006 WN_{2}	—	November 20, 2006	Catalina	CSS	T_{j} (2.92)	2.2 km	MPC · JPL
663000	2006 WD_{6}	—	October 22, 2006	Mount Lemmon	Mount Lemmon Survey	·	940 m	MPC · JPL

back to top

== Meaning of names ==
As minor planet discoveries are confirmed, they are given a permanent number by the IAU's Minor Planet Center (MPC), and the discoverers can then submit names for them, following the IAU's naming conventions. The list below concerns those minor planets in the specified number-range that have received names, and explains the meanings of those names.

Official naming citations of newly named small Solar System bodies are approved and published in a bulletin by IAU's Working Group for Small Bodies Nomenclature (WGSBN). Before May 2021, citations were published in MPC's Minor Planet Circulars for many decades. Recent citations can also be found on the JPL Small-Body Database (SBDB). Until his death in 2016, German astronomer Lutz D. Schmadel compiled these citations into the Dictionary of Minor Planet Names (DMP) and regularly updated the collection.

Based on Paul Herget's The Names of the Minor Planets, Schmadel also researched the unclear origin of numerous asteroids, most of which had been named prior to World War II. This article incorporates text from this source, which is in the public domain: SBDB New namings may only be added to this list below after official publication as the preannouncement of names is condemned. The WGSBN publishes a comprehensive guideline for the naming rules of non-cometary small Solar System bodies.

Named minor planet	Provisional	This minor planet was named for...	Ref · Catalog
662131 Kierancarroll	2005 UE_{525}	Kieran A. Carroll (b. 1960) is a Canadian adjunct professor at the University of Toronto Institute for Aerospace studies. He was a driving force behind the Canadian Space Agency's Near Earth Object Surveillance Satellite (NEOSSat).	IAU · 662131
662607 Cosialls	2006 LG_{8}	Anicet Cosialls, Catalan chemist and high-school teacher from Lleida, Spain.	IAU · 662607
