= 2004 FH =

Near-Earth asteroid

- Flyby of asteroid 2004 FH; (Note: Flyby of asteroid 2004 FH (center dot being followed by the sequence). The other object that flashes by is an artificial satellite. Images were taken by Stefano Sposetti and composited by Raoul Behrend of Geneva Observatory.) the object that flashes by is a man-made satellite.

Discovery
- Discovered by: LINEAR
- Discovery site: Lincoln Lab's ETS
- Discovery date: 16 March 2004

Designations
- Alternative designations: 2004 FH
- Minor planet category: NEO · Aten

Orbital characteristics
- Epoch 21 Nov 2025 (JD 2461000.5)
- Uncertainty parameter 1
- Observation arc: 6184 days (16.93 years)
- Aphelion: 1.0559 AU
- Perihelion: 0.5826 AU
- Semi-major axis: 0.8193 AU
- Eccentricity: 0.2888
- Orbital period (sidereal): 0.7415 yr (270.84 days)
- Mean anomaly: 333.74°
- Mean motion: 1° 19^{m} 45.12^{s} / day
- Inclination: 0.0549°
- Longitude of ascending node: 258.20°
- Argument of perihelion: 69.180°
- Earth MOID: 0.000484 AU

Physical characteristics
- Dimensions: 24 m (calculated); 30 m (estimate)
- Synodic rotation period: 0.0504 h (3.02 min)
- Geometric albedo: 0.20 (assumed)
- Spectral type: S (assumed)
- Absolute magnitude (H): 25.7

2004 FH is a micro-asteroid and near-Earth object of the Aten group, approximately 30 meters in diameter, that passed just 43,000 km (27,000 mi) above the Earth's surface on 18 March 2004, at 22:08 UTC. It was the 11th-closest approach to Earth recorded as of 21 November 2008. (Note: Rankings depend on definitions of meteoroid and approach. The 2–10 m 1972 grazer was at 57 km, the 44 kg 1990 grazer was about 100 km, possible 2006 grazer size and altitude not available. See List of asteroid close approaches to Earth.) The asteroid was first observed on 16 March 2004, by astronomers of the Lincoln Near-Earth Asteroid Research at the Lincoln Laboratory's Experimental Test Site near Socorro, New Mexico.

== Orbit and classification ==
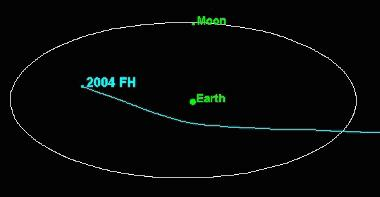
Trajectory of 2004 FH in the Earth–Moon system

2004 FH is an Aten asteroid. It passed 43,000 km from the Earth on 18 March 2004. For comparison, geostationary satellites orbit Earth at 35,790 kilometers. Despite its small size, it is still the fourth-largest asteroid detected coming closer to the Earth than the Moon.

Had this object hit Earth, it would probably have detonated high in the atmosphere. It might have produced a blast measured in hundreds of kilotons of TNT, but may not have produced any effect on the ground. It could also have been an Earth-grazing fireball if it had been much closer but not close enough to impact.

On 17 March 2044 the asteroid will pass no closer than 0.0116 AU (1.74 million km; 1.08 million mi) from the Earth. 2004 FH also has the distinction of having the lowest inclination of any known near-Earth asteroids.

Two weeks later another asteroid approached even closer, 2004 FU162, which was smaller; and a few years later 2009 DD45, which was closer in size, passed by at similar distance.

== Physical characteristics ==
2004 FH is an assumed stony S-type asteroid.

=== Rotation period ===
In March 2004, two rotational lightcurves of 2004 FH were obtained from photometric observations by astronomers Petr Pravec, Stefano Sposetti and Raoul Behrend. Lightcurve analysis gave a rotation period of 0.0504 hours (3.02 minutes) with a brightness amplitude of 1.16 and 0.75 magnitude, respectively (U=3/2+).

This makes this object a fast rotator, currently among the Top 100 known to exist. The photometric observations also revealed that 2004 FH is a tumbler with a non-principal axis rotation.

=== Diameter and albedo ===
2004 FH has been estimated to measure approximately 30 meters (98 feet) in diameter. The Collaborative Asteroid Lightcurve Link assumes a standard albedo for stony asteroids of 0.20 and calculates a diameter of 24 meters based on an absolute magnitude of 25.7.
