= Stefano Sposetti =

Swiss astronomer

Flyby of Asteroid 2004 FH in March 2004. The other object that flashes by is an artificial satellite. Images were by Stefano Sposetti and composite by Raoul Behrend at Geneva Observatory.

Stefano Sposetti (born 22 December 1958) is a Swiss amateur astronomer and a prolific discoverer of minor planets. He lives in Gnosca, in the Italian-speaking part of Switzerland in the Ticino Alps, where the Gnosca Observatory is located.

Sposetti took images of 2004 FH, an Aten asteroid that made a sub-lunar flyby of Earth. In addition, he detects the optical counterparts of gamma-ray bursts and conducts transit photometry on exoplanets at his observatory.

As of 2019, Sposetti's discoveries include 164 minor planets (numbered only). The Minor Planet Center ranks him 70th in the list of all-time, worldwide discoverers. Asteroid 22354 Sposetti has been named after him.

Minor planets discovered: 164
see § List of discovered minor planets

== List of discovered minor planets ==
List of minor planets

| 12931 Mario | 7 October 1999 | list |
| 12932 Conedera | 10 October 1999 | list |
| 15077 Edyalge | 2 February 1999 | list |
| 16110 Paganetti | 28 November 1999 | list |
| 17190 Retopezzoli | 28 November 1999 | list |
| (18056) 1999 TV_{15} | 11 October 1999 | list |
| 18872 Tammann | 8 November 1999 | list |
| 18874 Raoulbehrend | 8 November 1999 | list |
| 19715 Basodino | 27 October 1999 | list |
| 20624 Dariozanetti | 9 October 1999 | list |

| 21650 Tilgner | 17 July 1999 | list |
| 22769 Aurelianora | 19 January 1999 | list |
| 22898 Falce | 10 October 1999 | list |
| (25397) 1999 VY_{10} | 7 November 1999 | list |
| (26321) 1998 VT_{5} | 11 November 1998 | list |
| (27249) 1999 WO_{8} | 28 November 1999 | list |
| 29753 Silvo | 10 February 1999 | list |
| 31555 Wheeler | 7 March 1999 | list |
| 33433 Maurilia | 14 March 1999 | list |
| (33445) 1999 FB_{21} | 23 March 1999 | list |

| (34125) 2000 QZ | 23 August 2000 | list |
| (34126) 2000 QA_{1} | 23 August 2000 | list |
| (36447) 2000 QB_{1} | 23 August 2000 | list |
| (38679) 2000 QX | 22 August 2000 | list |
| (41204) 1999 WX_{8} | 28 November 1999 | list |
| (41205) 1999 WZ_{8} | 28 November 1999 | list |
| (41301) 1999 XP_{127} | 6 December 1999 | list |
| 41979 Lelumacri | 22 December 2000 | list |
| (43027) 1999 VA_{23} | 12 November 1999 | list |
| (43028) 1999 VE_{23} | 12 November 1999 | list |

| 43087 Castegna | 28 November 1999 | list |
| 45027 Cosquer | 28 November 1999 | list |
| (45074) 1999 XA_{38} | 6 December 1999 | list |
| (45075) 1999 XB_{38} | 6 December 1999 | list |
| 45261 Decoen | 2 January 2000 | list |
| 45305 Paulscherrer | 4 January 2000 | list |
| 47164 Ticino | 10 October 1999 | list |
| 47494 Gerhardangl | 4 January 2000 | list |
| (47981) 2000 WG_{183} | 30 November 2000 | list |
| 50033 Perelman | 3 January 2000 | list |

| 53252 Sardegna | 13 March 1999 | list |
| 53468 Varros | 2 January 2000 | list |
| 54522 Menaechmus | 23 August 2000 | list |
| 56100 Luisapolli | 24 January 1999 | list |
| 59239 Alhazen | 7 February 1999 | list |
| 61195 Martinoli | 28 July 2000 | list |
| 61384 Arturoromer | 22 August 2000 | list |
| 61386 Namikoshi | 24 August 2000 | list |
| 61401 Schiff | 25 August 2000 | list |
| 61402 Franciseveritt | 25 August 2000 | list |

| 62071 Voegtli | 8 September 2000 | list |
| 63129 Courtemanche | 30 November 2000 | list |
| 66939 Franscini | 28 November 1999 | list |
| 67085 Oppenheimer | 4 January 2000 | list |
| 67235 Fairbank | 5 March 2000 | list |
| 70179 Beppechiara | 21 August 1999 | list |
| 70446 Pugh | 10 October 1999 | list |
| 70737 Stenflo | 8 November 1999 | list |
| 70942 Vandanashiva | 28 November 1999 | list |
| 72042 Dequeiroz | 17 December 2000 | list |

| 72632 Coralina | 23 March 2001 | list |
| 74818 Iten | 7 October 1999 | list |
| 75063 Koestler | 1 November 1999 | list |
| 75569 IRSOL | 2 January 2000 | list |
| 80135 Zanzanini | 7 October 1999 | list |
| 87644 Cathomen | 8 September 2000 | list |
| (87645) 2000 RK_{77} | 9 September 2000 | list |
| 88146 Castello | 30 November 2000 | list |
| 91428 Cortesi | 20 August 1999 | list |
| 91429 Michelebianda | 30 August 1999 | list |

| 91898 Margnetti | 8 November 1999 | list |
| 92525 Delucchi | 28 July 2000 | list |
| 92585 Fumagalli | 7 August 2000 | list |
| 92614 Kazutami | 23 August 2000 | list |
| (92615) 2000 QR_{1} | 23 August 2000 | list |
| (92616) 2000 QU_{1} | 24 August 2000 | list |
| (93949) 2000 WZ_{178} | 30 November 2000 | list |
| 96876 Andreamanna | 7 October 1999 | list |
| 97069 Stek | 12 November 1999 | list |
| 97186 Tore | 28 November 1999 | list |

| (98873) 2001 BO_{11} | 20 January 2001 | list |
| (102223) 1999 TE_{12} | 10 October 1999 | list |
| 102224 Raffaellolena | 10 October 1999 | list |
| 102617 Allium | 12 November 1999 | list |
| 102619 Crespino | 12 November 1999 | list |
| (103289) 2000 AF_{42} | 2 January 2000 | list |
| (105251) 2000 QP_{6} | 24 August 2000 | list |
| (107676) 2001 FD_{10} | 17 March 2001 | list |
| (121517) 1999 UO_{11} | 31 October 1999 | list |
| (121541) 1999 UZ_{51} | 31 October 1999 | list |

| (123499) 2000 WY_{178} | 30 November 2000 | list |
| (123612) 2000 YL_{16} | 22 December 2000 | list |
| (123955) 2001 FC_{10} | 17 March 2001 | list |
| (134793) 2000 EH_{15} | 5 March 2000 | list |
| (137498) 1999 VP_{8} | 7 November 1999 | list |
| (137636) 1999 WS_{8} | 28 November 1999 | list |
| (138543) 2000 QR_{6} | 25 August 2000 | list |
| (145988) 2000 BC_{4} | 26 January 2000 | list |
| (148448) 2000 YB_{1} | 17 December 2000 | list |
| (156474) 2002 CN_{46} | 11 February 2002 | list |

| (164358) 2005 DB | 16 February 2005 | list |
| (164360) 2005 EL_{2} | 1 March 2005 | list |
| (164915) 1999 XC_{38} | 6 December 1999 | list |
| (167853) 2005 DN | 26 February 2005 | list |
| (168473) 1999 QU_{1} | 20 August 1999 | list |
| (170974) 2005 CN_{25} | 4 February 2005 | list |
| (171552) 1999 TD_{12} | 10 October 1999 | list |
| (171579) 1999 VD_{23} | 12 November 1999 | list |
| (172836) 2005 CX_{37} | 7 February 2005 | list |
| (178116) 2006 TK_{7} | 10 October 2006 | list |

| (185748) 1999 NX_{4} | 15 July 1999 | list |
| (187461) 2005 XM_{65} | 7 December 2005 | list |
| (189521) 2000 OB_{7} | 30 July 2000 | list |
| (190167) 2005 UW_{158} | 26 October 2005 | list |
| (191093) 2002 EF | 3 March 2002 | list |
| (196800) 2003 SX_{200} | 25 September 2003 | list |
| 199194 Calcatreppola | 3 January 2006 | list |
| (200511) 2001 BN_{11} | 16 January 2001 | list |
| (207174) 2005 CK_{67} | 15 February 2005 | list |
| (207175) 2005 CL_{67} | 15 February 2005 | list |

| (211211) 2002 PR_{11} | 5 August 2002 | list |
| 215868 Rohrer | 12 March 2005 | list |
| (219164) 1999 TA_{14} | 11 October 1999 | list |
| (219202) 1999 VZ_{10} | 7 November 1999 | list |
| (227545) 2005 YZ_{128} | 25 December 2005 | list |
| (236194) 2005 WD_{57} | 20 November 2005 | list |
| (245494) 2005 QX_{56} | 29 August 2005 | list |
| (257692) 1999 WT_{8} | 28 November 1999 | list |
| (260483) 2005 CO_{38} | 9 February 2005 | list |
| (261581) 2005 XD_{8} | 6 December 2005 | list |

| (261582) 2005 XE_{8} | 6 December 2005 | list |
| (262776) 2006 YA_{12} | 22 December 2006 | list |
| (262777) 2006 YR_{12} | 23 December 2006 | list |
| (262778) 2006 YZ_{12} | 25 December 2006 | list |
| (268227) 2005 ED_{30} | 4 March 2005 | list |
| (285405) 1999 UZ_{3} | 26 October 1999 | list |
| (290870) 2005 WE_{57} | 20 November 2005 | list |
| (290873) 2005 WA_{58} | 30 November 2005 | list |
| (293155) 2006 YX_{12} | 24 December 2006 | list |
| (293156) 2006 YK_{14} | 25 December 2006 | list |

| (301934) 2000 AE_{48} | 3 January 2000 | list |
| (303472) 2005 CM_{67} | 15 February 2005 | list |
| (308182) 2005 CN_{38} | 8 February 2005 | list |
| (311523) 2005 XZ_{77} | 9 December 2005 | list |
| (312154) 2007 UU_{6} | 22 October 2007 | list |
| (313020) 1999 XZ_{37} | 6 December 1999 | list |
| (330065) 2005 VQ_{5} | 10 November 2005 | list |
| (330393) 2006 YJ_{14} | 24 December 2006 | list |
| 332326 Aresi | 27 December 2006 | list |
| (356274) 2009 YC_{7} | 16 December 2009 | list |

| (363033) 1999 QN_{2} | 30 August 1999 | list |
| (370857) 2005 EK_{2} | 1 March 2005 | list |
| (383475) 2007 AU_{8} | 11 January 2007 | list |
| (384458) 2010 BM_{2} | 18 January 2010 | list |
| (387934) 2005 CV_{37} | 6 February 2005 | list |
| (400337) 2007 UZ_{65} | 31 October 2007 | list |
| (405518) 2005 CJ_{67} | 15 February 2005 | list |
| (413993) 2007 EC_{125} | 13 March 2007 | list |
| (429240) 2010 AL_{76} | 14 January 2010 | list |
| (438098) 2005 CS_{56} | 9 February 2005 | list |

| (475201) 2005 VR_{5} | 10 November 2005 | list |
| (481322) 2006 BT | 19 January 2006 | list |
| (483891) 2006 AB_{4} | 6 January 2006 | list |
| (498269) 2007 VW_{4} | 3 November 2007 | list |

== See also ==
- List of minor planet discoverers § S. Sposetti
