= Decatur =

Decatur commonly refers to:

- Decatur, Alabama, the county seat of Morgan County
  - Decatur metropolitan area, Alabama, the largest metro area with the name Decatur
- Decatur, Illinois, the county seat of Macon County and largest city with the name Decatur
  - Lake Decatur, a reservoir in the city

Decatur may also refer to a number of places, streets, military establishments, schools, and others mostly named after Stephen Decatur:

== Places ==
- Decatur, Arkansas, a city
- Decatur, Georgia, the county seat of DeKalb County
- Decatur, Indiana, the county seat of Adams County
- Decatur City, Iowa, a city in Decatur County
- Decatur, Kentucky, an unincorporated community in Russell County
- Decatur, Michigan, a village
- Decatur, Mississippi, the county seat of Newton County
- Decatur, Missouri, a ghost town
- Decatur, Nebraska, a village
- Decatur, New York, a town
- Decatur, Ohio, an unincorporated community
- Decatur, Tennessee, the county seat of Meigs County
- Decatur, Texas, the county seat of Wise County
- Decatur, Washington, an unincorporated community
- Decatur, Wisconsin, a town
- Decatur County (disambiguation)
- Decatur Township (disambiguation)
- Decatur Island, one of the San Juan Islands in Washington state

== Transportation ==
- Decatur Boulevard, Las Vegas, Nevada, a north–south thoroughfare
- Decatur Highway, U.S. Route 31 in Alabama between Decatur and Birmingham
- Decatur Street (disambiguation)
- Decatur (MARTA station), a railroad station in Decatur, Georgia

== Military uses ==
- USS Decatur, several ships of the U.S. Navy
- Decatur (1813 ship), an American privateer of the War of 1812
- Fort Decatur, a fort in New York during the War of 1812

== Other uses ==
- Decatur (name), a list of people with either the surname or given name
- 34351 Decatur, an asteroid
- Decatur High School (disambiguation)
- Arizona Charlie's Decatur, a casino hotel in Las Vegas
- "Decatur Psalm", a song from the 1996 album ATLiens by Outkast
- "Decatur", a song from the 2023 album Since I Have a Lover by 6lack
- "Decatur", a song from the 1992 album Headsparks by Seam
- "Decatur, or, Round of Applause for Your Step Mother!", a song from the 2005 album Illinois by Sufjan Stevens

== See also ==
- Decatur Subdivision, a former railroad line in Illinois and Indiana
