= Decatur metropolitan area =

The Decatur metropolitan area may refer to:

- Decatur metropolitan area, Alabama
- Decatur metropolitan area, Illinois
- Adams County, Indiana, Comprises the Decatur, Indiana, micropolitan area

== See also ==
- Decatur (disambiguation)
