= Loren C. Ball =

American astronomer (born 1948)

- Born: 1948 (age 77–78); Watonga, Oklahoma, United States
- Known for: Amateur astronomer specialising in the discovery of Minor planets

Minor planets discovered: 112
see § List of discovered minor planets

Loren C. Ball (born 1948 in Watonga, Oklahoma, United States) is an American amateur astronomer, who has discovered more than 100 asteroids while working at his Emerald Lane Observatory (843), built on the roof of his house on Emerald Lane, Decatur, Alabama. As of 2026, he has credit for 112 numbered designations with the Minor Planet Center at Harvard for the period between 2000 and 2004. None of them were co-discoveries. He is under contract with NASA through the University of Alabama in Huntsville to do outreach to school groups and organisations. As of 2024, he promotes asteroid education in schools and on social media.

The main-belt asteroid 16095 Lorenball, discovered by astronomers with the Catalina Sky Survey in 1999, is named after him. The official naming citation was published by the Minor Planet Center on 8 November 2019 (M.P.C. 118219).

== List of discovered minor planets ==
34351 Decatur	3 September 2000	list
51599 Brittany	28 April 2001	list
61400 Voxandreae	25 August 2000	list
62701 Davidrankin	7 October 2000	list
(64123) 2001 TS_{18}	15 October 2001	list
(65260) 2002 GE_{2}	6 April 2002	list
72834 Guywells	25 April 2001	list
73073 Jannaleuty	4 April 2002	list
(73196) 2002 JZ_{10}	8 May 2002	list
(78284) 2002 PC_{43}	11 August 2002	list
(83596) 2001 SC_{263}	25 September 2001	list
(88377) 2001 PK_{29}	15 August 2001	list
92586 Jaxonpowell	9 August 2000	list
93164 Gordontelepun	29 September 2000	list
(93466) 2000 TO	2 October 2000	list
(93490) 2000 TV_{33}	8 October 2000	list
(94404) 2001 SO_{287}	30 September 2001	list
(105272) 2000 QD_{25}	26 August 2000	list
(105508) 2000 RA_{9}	3 September 2000	list
(106096) 2000 TQ	2 October 2000	list

(108917) 2001 PX_{14}	15 August 2001	list
112483 Missjudy	1 August 2002	list
(112484) 2002 PB_{1}	4 August 2002	list
(112539) 2002 PB_{40}	8 August 2002	list
(114910) 2003 QA_{29}	24 August 2003	list
115492 Watonga	23 October 2003	list
119195 Margaretgreer	25 August 2001	list
(120148) 2003 GO_{51}	12 April 2003	list
(125266) 2001 VG	7 November 2001	list
128345 Danielbamberger	15 April 2004	list
(131327) 2001 HC_{23}	27 April 2001	list
(131414) 2001 NB_{6}	14 July 2001	list
(131446) 2001 QP_{100}	24 August 2001	list
(132296) 2002 GB_{1}	4 April 2002	list
(132298) 2002 GD_{2}	6 April 2002	list
(140603) 2001 UQ	18 October 2001	list
(140632) 2001 UQ_{17}	26 October 2001	list
(140633) 2001 UR_{17}	26 October 2001	list
(142155) 2002 RT_{28}	6 September 2002	list
(144553) 2004 FB_{6}	23 March 2004	list

(148772) 2001 UU_{2}	20 October 2001	list
(153175) 2000 UN_{2}	24 October 2000	list
(153757) 2001 UN_{210}	21 October 2001	list
(154345) 2002 WS_{18}	29 November 2002	list
(156036) 2001 SD	16 September 2001	list
(158330) 2001 WK_{2}	18 November 2001	list
(160165) 2001 UR	18 October 2001	list
(163363) 2002 OV_{19}	29 July 2002	list
(166422) 2002 PS_{1}	5 August 2002	list
(166857) 2002 XE	1 December 2002	list
(170072) 2002 VG_{128}	14 November 2002	list
(173449) 2000 QO_{6}	25 August 2000	list
(173875) 2001 UQ_{14}	24 October 2001	list
(177191) 2003 UD_{10}	20 October 2003	list
(180683) 2004 HF	16 April 2004	list
(182595) 2001 UH_{18}	29 October 2001	list
(183379) 2002 XL_{44}	7 December 2002	list
(187987) 2001 RJ_{43}	12 September 2001	list
(189076) 2001 HN	16 April 2001	list
(193801) 2001 PV_{13}	14 August 2001	list

(193947) 2001 RA_{46}	15 September 2001	list
(194124) 2001 SD_{263}	25 September 2001	list
(195511) 2002 HV_{5}	19 April 2002	list
(195874) 2002 RC_{1}	3 September 2002	list
(203866) 2002 XF	1 December 2002	list
(205558) 2001 SF_{273}	27 September 2001	list
(209155) 2003 UE_{10}	20 October 2003	list
(213785) 2003 FZ_{4}	25 March 2003	list
(219382) 2000 SU_{89}	29 September 2000	list
(219590) 2001 TQ_{18}	15 October 2001	list
(222873) 2002 GL	3 April 2002	list
(237607) 2001 QQ_{71}	21 August 2001	list
(239965) 2001 NC_{6}	14 July 2001	list
(242244) 2003 SW_{217}	28 September 2003	list
(243777) 2000 SJ	19 September 2000	list
(247588) 2002 TW_{92}	2 October 2002	list
(259901) 2004 EL	11 March 2004	list
(264594) 2001 UM_{1}	19 October 2001	list
(270980) 2002 WJ_{11}	25 November 2002	list
(286262) 2001 VK_{17}	12 November 2001	list

(286762) 2002 HU_{4}	16 April 2002	list
(287059) 2002 RF_{1}	4 September 2002	list
(287436) 2002 XP_{3}	2 December 2002	list
(287622) 2003 HO_{16}	28 April 2003	list
(288473) 2004 FA_{6}	23 March 2004	list
(297382) 2000 QC	21 August 2000	list
(298268) 2002 XG	1 December 2002	list
(298353) 2003 KU_{16}	28 May 2003	list
(302625) 2002 RD_{1}	4 September 2002	list
(313062) 2000 SS_{89}	29 September 2000	list
(317288) 2002 GR_{1}	5 April 2002	list
(323243) 2003 SO_{201}	23 September 2003	list
(333352) 2001 UK_{6}	22 October 2001	list
(334264) 2001 UH_{6}	22 October 2001	list
(337704) 2001 UJ_{6}	22 October 2001	list
(337814) 2001 VG_{2}	10 November 2001	list
(344229) 2001 SC	16 September 2001	list
(344291) 2001 UQ_{4}	21 October 2001	list
(344455) 2002 LE_{47}	15 June 2002	list
(354414) 2003 VA	1 November 2003	list

(357096) 2001 TR_{18}	15 October 2001	list
(373481) 2000 TP	2 October 2000	list
(390557) 2000 UL_{2}	24 October 2000	list
(399394) 2001 SL_{287}	29 September 2001	list
(405121) 2002 GF_{2}	6 April 2002	list
(415816) 2001 QT_{71}	21 August 2001	list
(434064) 2001 VX_{71}	12 November 2001	list
(601867) 2013 UL_{12}	1 September 2002	list
(629360) 2001 UR_{4}	21 October 2001	list
(661253) 2004 EM	11 March 2004	list
(720301) 2000 SK	19 September 2000	list
(848006) 2002 TF_{150}	29 September 2002	list

== See also ==
- List of minor planet discoverers § L. Ball
