= Decatur (name) =

Decatur is a given name and a surname which may refer to:

- Daniel Decatur Emmet (1815–1904), songwriter
- Art Decatur (1894–1966), Major League Baseball pitcher
- C. D. Howe (Clarence Decatur Howe, 1886–1960), Canadian cabinet minister and businessman
- Sean M. Decatur (born 1969), African-American chemist, college administrator and 19th president of Kenyon College
- Stephen Decatur (1779–1820), American naval commodore
- Stephen Decatur Sr. (1751–1808), American naval captain in the Revolutionary War
- Decatur Dorsey (1836–1891), African-American Union Army soldier and Medal of Honor recipient
- Decatur Trotter (1932–2004), African-American politician
- Doug Decatur (1958–), baseball writer
