= Decatur Street =

Decatur Street can refer to:

- Decatur Street (Atlanta), Georgia, U.S.
- Decatur Street (New Orleans), Louisiana, U.S.
- Decatur Street (Brooklyn), New York, U.S.

== See also ==
- Decatur (disambiguation)
