= List of minor planets: 720001–721000 =

The following is a partial list of minor planets, running from minor-planet number 720001 through 721000, inclusive. The primary data for this and other partial lists is based on JPL's "Small-Body Orbital Elements" and data available from the Minor Planet Center. Critical list information is also provided by the MPC, unless otherwise specified from Lowell Observatory. A detailed description of the table's columns and additional sources are given on the main page including a complete list of every page in this series, and a statistical break-up on the dynamical classification of minor planets.

Also see the summary list of all named bodies in numerical and alphabetical order, and the corresponding naming citations for the number range of this particular list. New namings may only be added to this list after official publication, as the preannouncement of names is condemned by the Working Group for Small Bodies Nomenclature of the International Astronomical Union.

Near-Earth obj.	MBA (inner)	MBA (outer)	Centaur
Mars-crosser	MBA (middle)	Jupiter trojan	Trans-Neptunian obj.
Unclassified

== 720001–720100 ==
Designation			Discovery			Properties		Ref
Permanent	Provisional	Named after	Date	Site	Discoverer(s)	Category	Diam.	Ref
720001	1990 SM_{24}	—	January 14, 2002	Palomar	NEAT	·	2.1 km	MPC · JPL
720002	1993 FE_{85}	—	October 24, 2013	Mount Lemmon	Mount Lemmon Survey	·	1.4 km	MPC · JPL
720003	1993 SZ_{16}	—	March 19, 2013	Haleakala	Pan-STARRS 1	·	2.9 km	MPC · JPL
720004	1993 TL_{8}	—	October 8, 2012	Mount Lemmon	Mount Lemmon Survey	·	1.6 km	MPC · JPL
720005	1994 CY_{6}	—	February 15, 1994	Kitt Peak	Spacewatch	·	1.2 km	MPC · JPL
720006	1994 SU_{1}	—	September 27, 1994	Kitt Peak	Spacewatch	·	590 m	MPC · JPL
720007	1994 SS_{4}	—	September 28, 1994	Kitt Peak	Spacewatch	·	850 m	MPC · JPL
720008	1994 TY_{17}	—	October 5, 2018	Mount Lemmon	Mount Lemmon Survey	·	1.5 km	MPC · JPL
720009	1994 WT_{6}	—	November 28, 1994	Kitt Peak	Spacewatch	·	1.1 km	MPC · JPL
720010	1994 XP_{2}	—	October 10, 2007	Mount Lemmon	Mount Lemmon Survey	·	1.3 km	MPC · JPL
720011	1995 BH_{13}	—	January 31, 1995	Kitt Peak	Spacewatch	PHO	770 m	MPC · JPL
720012	1995 BF_{15}	—	January 31, 1995	Kitt Peak	Spacewatch	·	900 m	MPC · JPL
720013	1995 CA_{5}	—	February 1, 1995	Kitt Peak	Spacewatch	AGN	1.2 km	MPC · JPL
720014	1995 GD_{10}	—	January 20, 2012	Haleakala	Pan-STARRS 1	·	4.1 km	MPC · JPL
720015	1995 KB	—	May 19, 1995	Haleakala	AMOS	·	1.1 km	MPC · JPL
720016	1995 OQ_{17}	—	July 24, 1995	Kitt Peak	Spacewatch	·	1.1 km	MPC · JPL
720017	1995 QQ_{16}	—	August 28, 1995	Kitt Peak	Spacewatch	LIX	2.8 km	MPC · JPL
720018	1995 QE_{17}	—	November 16, 2009	Mount Lemmon	Mount Lemmon Survey	·	1.2 km	MPC · JPL
720019	1995 ST_{1}	—	September 20, 1995	Haleakala	AMOS	·	3.6 km	MPC · JPL
720020	1995 SU_{6}	—	September 17, 1995	Kitt Peak	Spacewatch	·	1.9 km	MPC · JPL
720021	1995 SH_{9}	—	September 17, 1995	Kitt Peak	Spacewatch	·	700 m	MPC · JPL
720022	1995 SB_{17}	—	September 18, 1995	Kitt Peak	Spacewatch	·	540 m	MPC · JPL
720023	1995 SZ_{47}	—	September 26, 1995	Kitt Peak	Spacewatch	(5)	1.2 km	MPC · JPL
720024	1995 SA_{58}	—	September 22, 1995	Kitt Peak	Spacewatch	EUN	980 m	MPC · JPL
720025	1995 SN_{58}	—	September 23, 1995	Kitt Peak	Spacewatch	·	2.6 km	MPC · JPL
720026	1995 SP_{71}	—	September 19, 1995	Kitt Peak	Spacewatch	·	960 m	MPC · JPL
720027	1995 SB_{78}	—	September 30, 1995	Kitt Peak	Spacewatch	·	730 m	MPC · JPL
720028	1995 SL_{79}	—	September 21, 1995	Kitt Peak	Spacewatch	·	2.7 km	MPC · JPL
720029	1995 TR_{7}	—	October 15, 1995	Kitt Peak	Spacewatch	·	1.3 km	MPC · JPL
720030	1995 UX_{62}	—	October 25, 1995	Kitt Peak	Spacewatch	HOF	2.1 km	MPC · JPL
720031	1995 UU_{65}	—	October 28, 1995	Kitt Peak	Spacewatch	·	1.9 km	MPC · JPL
720032	1996 AR_{11}	—	January 14, 1996	Kitt Peak	Spacewatch	EOS	1.4 km	MPC · JPL
720033	1996 BW_{17}	—	January 25, 1996	Socorro	LINEAR	·	2.2 km	MPC · JPL
720034	1996 HJ_{27}	—	March 10, 2003	Kitt Peak	Spacewatch	·	890 m	MPC · JPL
720035	1996 JR_{15}	—	May 13, 1996	Kitt Peak	Spacewatch	·	1.4 km	MPC · JPL
720036	1996 RP_{4}	—	September 12, 1996	Kitt Peak	Spacewatch	·	1.2 km	MPC · JPL
720037	1996 RC_{13}	—	September 8, 1996	Kitt Peak	Spacewatch	·	600 m	MPC · JPL
720038	1996 RX_{16}	—	September 13, 1996	Kitt Peak	Spacewatch	·	2.3 km	MPC · JPL
720039	1996 TW_{31}	—	October 9, 1996	Kitt Peak	Spacewatch	VER	2.3 km	MPC · JPL
720040	1996 VH_{17}	—	November 6, 1996	Kitt Peak	Spacewatch	·	4.3 km	MPC · JPL
720041	1996 VM_{22}	—	November 9, 1996	Kitt Peak	Spacewatch	VER	3.4 km	MPC · JPL
720042	1996 VO_{32}	—	October 4, 1996	Kitt Peak	Spacewatch	MAR	930 m	MPC · JPL
720043	1996 VC_{42}	—	January 27, 2007	Kitt Peak	Spacewatch	·	1.6 km	MPC · JPL
720044	1996 XT_{7}	—	December 1, 1996	Kitt Peak	Spacewatch	·	2.2 km	MPC · JPL
720045	1996 XS_{12}	—	December 6, 1996	Kitt Peak	Spacewatch	·	3.6 km	MPC · JPL
720046	1996 XO_{17}	—	December 5, 1996	Kitt Peak	Spacewatch	·	2.9 km	MPC · JPL
720047	1996 XQ_{36}	—	December 14, 1996	Kitt Peak	Spacewatch	THM	1.8 km	MPC · JPL
720048	1996 XL_{37}	—	July 25, 2014	Haleakala	Pan-STARRS 1	·	950 m	MPC · JPL
720049	1997 EF_{5}	—	March 4, 1997	Kitt Peak	Spacewatch	·	1.5 km	MPC · JPL
720050	1997 EG_{60}	—	September 9, 2007	Kitt Peak	Spacewatch	·	1.4 km	MPC · JPL
720051	1997 JP_{5}	—	May 1, 1997	Kitt Peak	Spacewatch	·	1.3 km	MPC · JPL
720052	1997 JP_{19}	—	May 2, 1997	Kitt Peak	Spacewatch	·	880 m	MPC · JPL
720053	1997 SK_{7}	—	March 11, 2010	WISE	WISE	·	2.2 km	MPC · JPL
720054	1997 SA_{12}	—	September 27, 1997	Kitt Peak	Spacewatch	3:2	4.6 km	MPC · JPL
720055	1997 ST_{19}	—	September 28, 1997	Kitt Peak	Spacewatch	·	860 m	MPC · JPL
720056	1997 SC_{32}	—	September 24, 1997	Bergisch Gladbach	W. Bickel	EUN	900 m	MPC · JPL
720057	1997 UX_{18}	—	October 28, 1997	Kitt Peak	Spacewatch	·	720 m	MPC · JPL
720058	1997 YM_{15}	—	December 29, 1997	Kitt Peak	Spacewatch	·	3.6 km	MPC · JPL
720059	1998 BB_{29}	—	January 25, 1998	Kitt Peak	Spacewatch	THM	2.1 km	MPC · JPL
720060	1998 EK_{22}	—	October 3, 2013	Kitt Peak	Spacewatch	HYG	2.2 km	MPC · JPL
720061	1998 HX_{15}	—	April 22, 1998	Kitt Peak	Spacewatch	·	1.3 km	MPC · JPL
720062	1998 HE_{16}	—	April 22, 1998	Kitt Peak	Spacewatch	·	1.4 km	MPC · JPL
720063	1998 HX_{27}	—	April 22, 1998	Kitt Peak	Spacewatch	·	2.8 km	MPC · JPL
720064	1998 KC_{43}	—	May 28, 1998	Kitt Peak	Spacewatch	·	4.3 km	MPC · JPL
720065	1998 ML_{5}	—	June 23, 1998	Kitt Peak	Spacewatch	·	3.4 km	MPC · JPL
720066	1998 OS_{15}	—	June 30, 1998	Kitt Peak	Spacewatch	·	1.6 km	MPC · JPL
720067	1998 RU_{10}	—	August 26, 1998	Kitt Peak	Spacewatch	·	670 m	MPC · JPL
720068	1998 SM_{16}	—	September 16, 1998	Kitt Peak	Spacewatch	·	970 m	MPC · JPL
720069	1998 ST_{38}	—	September 23, 1998	Kitt Peak	Spacewatch	·	1.4 km	MPC · JPL
720070	1998 SD_{151}	—	September 26, 1998	Socorro	LINEAR	·	2.8 km	MPC · JPL
720071	1998 ST_{173}	—	September 24, 1998	Kitt Peak	Spacewatch	EOS	2.4 km	MPC · JPL
720072	1998 SV_{173}	—	September 19, 1998	Apache Point	SDSS Collaboration	·	830 m	MPC · JPL
720073	1998 SZ_{177}	—	September 23, 2011	Haleakala	Pan-STARRS 1	HNS	970 m	MPC · JPL
720074	1998 SM_{178}	—	May 11, 2010	WISE	WISE	MAR	940 m	MPC · JPL
720075	1998 SN_{178}	—	November 22, 2006	Mount Lemmon	Mount Lemmon Survey	·	910 m	MPC · JPL
720076	1998 SV_{178}	—	January 24, 2014	Haleakala	Pan-STARRS 1	AGN	1 km	MPC · JPL
720077	1998 SA_{179}	—	October 20, 1993	Kitt Peak	Spacewatch	·	2.3 km	MPC · JPL
720078	1998 SD_{179}	—	September 19, 1998	Apache Point	SDSS Collaboration	·	540 m	MPC · JPL
720079	1998 SG_{179}	—	September 28, 2003	Kitt Peak	Spacewatch	·	1.5 km	MPC · JPL
720080	1998 SQ_{179}	—	January 29, 2011	Kitt Peak	Spacewatch	·	800 m	MPC · JPL
720081	1998 SX_{179}	—	February 7, 2006	Kitt Peak	Spacewatch	·	730 m	MPC · JPL
720082	1998 SK_{180}	—	September 6, 2013	Mount Lemmon	Mount Lemmon Survey	·	1.5 km	MPC · JPL
720083	1998 SR_{180}	—	September 17, 2009	Kitt Peak	Spacewatch	·	970 m	MPC · JPL
720084	1998 TQ_{1}	—	October 12, 1998	Kitt Peak	Spacewatch	·	1.7 km	MPC · JPL
720085	1998 TZ_{14}	—	October 14, 1998	Kitt Peak	Spacewatch	·	1.9 km	MPC · JPL
720086	1998 UX_{47}	—	August 18, 2006	Kitt Peak	Spacewatch	·	1.9 km	MPC · JPL
720087	1998 UD_{50}	—	August 28, 2016	Mount Lemmon	Mount Lemmon Survey	·	1.8 km	MPC · JPL
720088	1998 UZ_{50}	—	May 4, 2005	Mauna Kea	Veillet, C.	·	990 m	MPC · JPL
720089	1998 UC_{51}	—	October 19, 1998	Kitt Peak	Spacewatch	·	530 m	MPC · JPL
720090	1998 UY_{51}	—	October 19, 1998	Kitt Peak	Spacewatch	·	1.3 km	MPC · JPL
720091	1998 VP_{40}	—	November 14, 1998	Kitt Peak	Spacewatch	EMA	2.7 km	MPC · JPL
720092	1998 WY_{42}	—	September 30, 2003	Kitt Peak	Spacewatch	·	1.7 km	MPC · JPL
720093	1998 WD_{43}	—	September 27, 2009	Kitt Peak	Spacewatch	L4	6.0 km	MPC · JPL
720094	1998 WJ_{46}	—	September 23, 2011	Kitt Peak	Spacewatch	·	580 m	MPC · JPL
720095	1999 AU_{12}	—	January 7, 1999	Kitt Peak	Spacewatch	·	1.4 km	MPC · JPL
720096	1999 AW_{39}	—	November 11, 2009	Kitt Peak	Spacewatch	·	1.0 km	MPC · JPL
720097	1999 CF_{141}	—	January 22, 1999	Kitt Peak	Spacewatch	NYS	1.0 km	MPC · JPL
720098	1999 CT_{158}	—	March 17, 2005	Mount Lemmon	Mount Lemmon Survey	·	2.5 km	MPC · JPL
720099	1999 EQ_{15}	—	January 27, 2010	WISE	WISE	·	1.8 km	MPC · JPL
720100	1999 FD_{69}	—	March 7, 2003	Socorro	LINEAR	EUN	1.5 km	MPC · JPL

== 720101–720200 ==
back to top

Designation			Discovery			Properties		Ref
Permanent	Provisional	Named after	Date	Site	Discoverer(s)	Category	Diam.	Ref
720101	1999 FB_{71}	—	October 11, 2004	Kitt Peak	Deep Ecliptic Survey	·	1.1 km	MPC · JPL
720102	1999 FV_{74}	—	October 11, 2004	Kitt Peak	Spacewatch	·	890 m	MPC · JPL
720103	1999 FB_{76}	—	April 17, 1999	Kitt Peak	Spacewatch	·	1.4 km	MPC · JPL
720104	1999 FQ_{77}	—	March 20, 1999	Apache Point	SDSS Collaboration	·	1.7 km	MPC · JPL
720105	1999 FU_{78}	—	April 7, 2003	Kitt Peak	Spacewatch	·	1.7 km	MPC · JPL
720106	1999 FZ_{80}	—	March 20, 1999	Apache Point	SDSS	·	3.1 km	MPC · JPL
720107	1999 FH_{84}	—	December 19, 2003	Kitt Peak	Spacewatch	·	3.7 km	MPC · JPL
720108	1999 FA_{86}	—	January 10, 2008	Kitt Peak	Spacewatch	·	1.7 km	MPC · JPL
720109	1999 FL_{88}	—	September 21, 2001	Kitt Peak	Spacewatch	·	1.5 km	MPC · JPL
720110	1999 FY_{88}	—	September 19, 2001	Socorro	LINEAR	EOS	1.6 km	MPC · JPL
720111	1999 FF_{95}	—	March 21, 1999	Apache Point	SDSS Collaboration	·	3.2 km	MPC · JPL
720112	1999 FK_{97}	—	March 21, 1999	Apache Point	SDSS Collaboration	·	520 m	MPC · JPL
720113	1999 FQ_{97}	—	March 10, 1999	Kitt Peak	Spacewatch	·	650 m	MPC · JPL
720114	1999 FF_{98}	—	March 28, 2012	Kitt Peak	Spacewatch	·	3.7 km	MPC · JPL
720115	1999 FS_{98}	—	November 19, 2009	Mount Lemmon	Mount Lemmon Survey	·	1.0 km	MPC · JPL
720116	1999 FX_{98}	—	June 11, 2010	WISE	WISE	·	2.9 km	MPC · JPL
720117	1999 FA_{99}	—	March 20, 1999	Apache Point	SDSS	·	1.5 km	MPC · JPL
720118	1999 FC_{99}	—	September 15, 2006	Kitt Peak	Spacewatch	·	1.5 km	MPC · JPL
720119	1999 FD_{99}	—	June 26, 2010	WISE	WISE	·	1.8 km	MPC · JPL
720120	1999 FO_{99}	—	May 22, 2001	Cerro Tololo	Deep Ecliptic Survey	KOR	1.1 km	MPC · JPL
720121	1999 FQ_{99}	—	February 28, 2014	Haleakala	Pan-STARRS 1	·	990 m	MPC · JPL
720122	1999 FB_{100}	—	March 16, 2007	Mount Lemmon	Mount Lemmon Survey	H	420 m	MPC · JPL
720123	1999 FF_{100}	—	October 25, 2009	Kitt Peak	Spacewatch	·	1.2 km	MPC · JPL
720124	1999 FO_{100}	—	January 31, 2009	Mount Lemmon	Mount Lemmon Survey	·	2.6 km	MPC · JPL
720125	1999 FD_{101}	—	March 20, 1999	Apache Point	SDSS Collaboration	·	1.5 km	MPC · JPL
720126	1999 GW_{12}	—	April 12, 1999	Kitt Peak	Spacewatch	·	470 m	MPC · JPL
720127	1999 GF_{13}	—	April 12, 1999	Kitt Peak	Spacewatch	MAS	700 m	MPC · JPL
720128	1999 GA_{64}	—	April 6, 1999	Kitt Peak	Spacewatch	MAS	680 m	MPC · JPL
720129	1999 GD_{64}	—	September 26, 2005	Kitt Peak	Spacewatch	·	1.7 km	MPC · JPL
720130	1999 KC_{21}	—	March 26, 2007	Kitt Peak	Spacewatch	·	900 m	MPC · JPL
720131	1999 ON_{5}	—	September 28, 2003	Socorro	LINEAR	·	1.2 km	MPC · JPL
720132	1999 PG_{9}	—	November 22, 2012	Kitt Peak	Spacewatch	·	1.2 km	MPC · JPL
720133	1999 RL_{245}	—	September 6, 1999	Kitt Peak	Spacewatch	ARM	3.0 km	MPC · JPL
720134	1999 RM_{250}	—	April 5, 2014	Haleakala	Pan-STARRS 1	·	1.1 km	MPC · JPL
720135	1999 RH_{253}	—	September 8, 1999	Kitt Peak	Spacewatch	·	2.5 km	MPC · JPL
720136	1999 RW_{260}	—	September 2, 2016	Mount Lemmon	Mount Lemmon Survey	(5)	1.1 km	MPC · JPL
720137	1999 RZ_{260}	—	March 5, 2012	Kitt Peak	Spacewatch	·	1.8 km	MPC · JPL
720138	1999 SZ_{28}	—	August 28, 2006	Kitt Peak	Spacewatch	·	680 m	MPC · JPL
720139	1999 SA_{29}	—	July 13, 2013	Haleakala	Pan-STARRS 1	·	680 m	MPC · JPL
720140	1999 SD_{29}	—	July 5, 2016	Mount Lemmon	Mount Lemmon Survey	·	2.4 km	MPC · JPL
720141	1999 TC_{43}	—	September 21, 1999	Uccle	T. Pauwels	KOR	1.1 km	MPC · JPL
720142	1999 TS_{46}	—	October 4, 1999	Kitt Peak	Spacewatch	·	990 m	MPC · JPL
720143	1999 TT_{57}	—	October 6, 1999	Kitt Peak	Spacewatch	·	3.2 km	MPC · JPL
720144	1999 TX_{58}	—	October 6, 1999	Kitt Peak	Spacewatch	·	1.8 km	MPC · JPL
720145	1999 TH_{67}	—	October 8, 1999	Kitt Peak	Spacewatch	·	610 m	MPC · JPL
720146	1999 TB_{76}	—	October 10, 1999	Kitt Peak	Spacewatch	·	4.3 km	MPC · JPL
720147	1999 TB_{78}	—	September 24, 1960	Palomar	C. J. van Houten, I. van Houten-Groeneveld, T. Gehrels	·	780 m	MPC · JPL
720148	1999 TH_{82}	—	October 12, 1999	Kitt Peak	Spacewatch	·	730 m	MPC · JPL
720149	1999 TL_{83}	—	October 12, 1999	Kitt Peak	Spacewatch	ELF	2.6 km	MPC · JPL
720150	1999 TO_{85}	—	October 14, 1999	Kitt Peak	Spacewatch	THM	2.0 km	MPC · JPL
720151	1999 TR_{175}	—	October 10, 1999	Socorro	LINEAR	·	1.1 km	MPC · JPL
720152	1999 TL_{243}	—	October 6, 1999	Socorro	LINEAR	(5)	910 m	MPC · JPL
720153	1999 TZ_{302}	—	October 4, 1999	Kitt Peak	Spacewatch	·	900 m	MPC · JPL
720154	1999 TC_{303}	—	October 4, 1999	Kitt Peak	Spacewatch	·	1.4 km	MPC · JPL
720155	1999 TJ_{304}	—	October 4, 1999	Kitt Peak	Spacewatch	·	1.9 km	MPC · JPL
720156	1999 TX_{307}	—	October 4, 1999	Kitt Peak	Spacewatch	THM	2.5 km	MPC · JPL
720157	1999 TE_{318}	—	October 12, 1999	Kitt Peak	Spacewatch	HOF	2.1 km	MPC · JPL
720158	1999 TV_{321}	—	October 12, 1999	Kitt Peak	Spacewatch	·	1.0 km	MPC · JPL
720159	1999 TJ_{328}	—	October 11, 1999	Kitt Peak	Spacewatch	·	1.6 km	MPC · JPL
720160	1999 TF_{330}	—	November 20, 2004	Kitt Peak	Spacewatch	·	1.9 km	MPC · JPL
720161	1999 TK_{338}	—	October 14, 2012	Kitt Peak	Spacewatch	·	1.2 km	MPC · JPL
720162	1999 TR_{338}	—	October 10, 2007	Mount Lemmon	Mount Lemmon Survey	·	800 m	MPC · JPL
720163	1999 TK_{339}	—	November 13, 2010	Mount Lemmon	Mount Lemmon Survey	V	430 m	MPC · JPL
720164	1999 TL_{339}	—	October 30, 1999	Kitt Peak	Spacewatch	EUN	1.0 km	MPC · JPL
720165	1999 TS_{339}	—	February 4, 2005	Kitt Peak	Spacewatch	·	1.0 km	MPC · JPL
720166	1999 TF_{340}	—	May 23, 2010	WISE	WISE	·	3.0 km	MPC · JPL
720167	1999 TU_{340}	—	June 29, 2010	WISE	WISE	·	2.6 km	MPC · JPL
720168	1999 TW_{340}	—	October 24, 2014	Mount Lemmon	Mount Lemmon Survey	·	930 m	MPC · JPL
720169	1999 TB_{341}	—	January 5, 2017	Mount Lemmon	Mount Lemmon Survey	MAR	830 m	MPC · JPL
720170	1999 TC_{341}	—	February 20, 2014	Mount Lemmon	Mount Lemmon Survey	·	1.0 km	MPC · JPL
720171	1999 TN_{341}	—	November 21, 2001	Apache Point	SDSS Collaboration	L5	9.3 km	MPC · JPL
720172	1999 TP_{341}	—	June 26, 2010	WISE	WISE	·	3.8 km	MPC · JPL
720173	1999 UE_{18}	—	October 30, 1999	Kitt Peak	Spacewatch	·	1.9 km	MPC · JPL
720174	1999 UR_{65}	—	January 19, 2012	Haleakala	Pan-STARRS 1	·	3.1 km	MPC · JPL
720175	1999 UT_{65}	—	October 29, 1999	Kitt Peak	Spacewatch	KOR	1.2 km	MPC · JPL
720176	1999 UJ_{66}	—	July 8, 2014	Haleakala	Pan-STARRS 1	·	1.7 km	MPC · JPL
720177	1999 UK_{66}	—	October 21, 2012	Mount Lemmon	Mount Lemmon Survey	·	1.0 km	MPC · JPL
720178	1999 UP_{66}	—	November 30, 2005	Kitt Peak	Spacewatch	·	3.1 km	MPC · JPL
720179	1999 VZ_{42}	—	November 4, 1999	Kitt Peak	Spacewatch	(5)	700 m	MPC · JPL
720180	1999 VH_{75}	—	November 5, 1999	Kitt Peak	Spacewatch	(5)	1.0 km	MPC · JPL
720181	1999 VF_{99}	—	November 9, 1999	Socorro	LINEAR	·	3.4 km	MPC · JPL
720182	1999 VD_{175}	—	November 9, 1999	Kitt Peak	Spacewatch	·	580 m	MPC · JPL
720183	1999 VU_{211}	—	November 3, 1999	Kitt Peak	Spacewatch	·	560 m	MPC · JPL
720184	1999 VW_{220}	—	March 20, 2001	Haleakala	NEAT	·	1.4 km	MPC · JPL
720185	1999 VL_{232}	—	March 22, 2012	Mount Lemmon	Mount Lemmon Survey	·	700 m	MPC · JPL
720186	1999 VM_{232}	—	June 17, 2010	WISE	WISE	LUT	3.6 km	MPC · JPL
720187	1999 VO_{232}	—	November 1, 2008	Kitt Peak	Spacewatch	·	1.2 km	MPC · JPL
720188	1999 VT_{232}	—	February 28, 2014	Haleakala	Pan-STARRS 1	·	1.1 km	MPC · JPL
720189	1999 VD_{233}	—	November 11, 2006	Mount Lemmon	Mount Lemmon Survey	·	520 m	MPC · JPL
720190	1999 VN_{233}	—	November 9, 1999	Kitt Peak	Spacewatch	·	2.3 km	MPC · JPL
720191	1999 WK_{21}	—	August 15, 2013	Haleakala	Pan-STARRS 1	KOR	1.0 km	MPC · JPL
720192	1999 XO_{150}	—	December 8, 1999	Kitt Peak	Spacewatch	·	1.8 km	MPC · JPL
720193	1999 XL_{266}	—	November 17, 1999	Kitt Peak	Spacewatch	·	1.8 km	MPC · JPL
720194	2000 AN_{220}	—	January 8, 2000	Kitt Peak	Spacewatch	ARM	3.4 km	MPC · JPL
720195	2000 AO_{258}	—	March 13, 2011	Kitt Peak	Spacewatch	·	2.0 km	MPC · JPL
720196	2000 AT_{259}	—	July 11, 2016	Haleakala	Pan-STARRS 1	·	790 m	MPC · JPL
720197	2000 BD_{9}	—	January 26, 2000	Kitt Peak	Spacewatch	BRA	1.3 km	MPC · JPL
720198	2000 BZ_{36}	—	January 30, 2000	Kitt Peak	Spacewatch	·	4.8 km	MPC · JPL
720199	2000 BC_{42}	—	January 30, 2000	Kitt Peak	Spacewatch	·	2.6 km	MPC · JPL
720200	2000 BD_{42}	—	January 30, 2000	Kitt Peak	Spacewatch	·	2.8 km	MPC · JPL

== 720201–720300 ==
back to top

Designation			Discovery			Properties		Ref
Permanent	Provisional	Named after	Date	Site	Discoverer(s)	Category	Diam.	Ref
720201	2000 BW_{46}	—	January 29, 2000	Kitt Peak	Spacewatch	·	1.9 km	MPC · JPL
720202	2000 BL_{53}	—	January 20, 2013	Kitt Peak	Spacewatch	·	1.4 km	MPC · JPL
720203	2000 BN_{53}	—	February 7, 2010	WISE	WISE	L4	7.9 km	MPC · JPL
720204	2000 CP_{68}	—	February 1, 2000	Kitt Peak	Spacewatch	·	2.2 km	MPC · JPL
720205	2000 CR_{73}	—	February 7, 2000	Kitt Peak	Spacewatch	EMA	2.4 km	MPC · JPL
720206	2000 CR_{95}	—	February 8, 2000	Kitt Peak	Spacewatch	·	2.1 km	MPC · JPL
720207	2000 CP_{106}	—	February 8, 2000	Kitt Peak	Spacewatch	·	1.9 km	MPC · JPL
720208	2000 CW_{119}	—	December 3, 2005	Mauna Kea	A. Boattini	·	2.1 km	MPC · JPL
720209	2000 CG_{129}	—	February 3, 2000	Kitt Peak	Spacewatch	·	4.3 km	MPC · JPL
720210	2000 CS_{130}	—	February 1, 2000	Kitt Peak	Spacewatch	·	1.5 km	MPC · JPL
720211	2000 CS_{133}	—	March 20, 2010	WISE	WISE	·	1.6 km	MPC · JPL
720212	2000 CW_{142}	—	February 4, 2000	Kitt Peak	Spacewatch	·	820 m	MPC · JPL
720213	2000 CF_{143}	—	February 4, 2000	Kitt Peak	Spacewatch	·	1.7 km	MPC · JPL
720214	2000 CF_{151}	—	June 11, 2015	Haleakala	Pan-STARRS 1	·	2.1 km	MPC · JPL
720215	2000 CY_{151}	—	May 27, 2010	WISE	WISE	EUN	1.1 km	MPC · JPL
720216	2000 CH_{152}	—	October 26, 2013	Kitt Peak	Spacewatch	·	1.9 km	MPC · JPL
720217	2000 CL_{152}	—	January 7, 2016	Haleakala	Pan-STARRS 1	·	2.2 km	MPC · JPL
720218	2000 CQ_{152}	—	January 30, 2016	Mount Lemmon	Mount Lemmon Survey	·	1.8 km	MPC · JPL
720219	2000 CW_{152}	—	September 25, 2008	Kitt Peak	Spacewatch	·	3.4 km	MPC · JPL
720220	2000 CA_{153}	—	July 24, 2015	Haleakala	Pan-STARRS 1	·	3.2 km	MPC · JPL
720221	2000 CG_{153}	—	January 27, 2007	Kitt Peak	Spacewatch	·	1.2 km	MPC · JPL
720222	2000 CK_{153}	—	August 18, 2009	Kitt Peak	Spacewatch	·	1.1 km	MPC · JPL
720223	2000 CD_{155}	—	February 22, 2017	Haleakala	Pan-STARRS 1	·	2.5 km	MPC · JPL
720224	2000 CO_{156}	—	July 27, 2014	Haleakala	Pan-STARRS 1	·	1.4 km	MPC · JPL
720225	2000 DO_{91}	—	February 27, 2000	Kitt Peak	Spacewatch	NYS	810 m	MPC · JPL
720226	2000 DM_{115}	—	February 27, 2000	Kitt Peak	Spacewatch	·	2.3 km	MPC · JPL
720227	2000 ED_{24}	—	March 8, 2000	Kitt Peak	Spacewatch	·	3.0 km	MPC · JPL
720228	2000 EP_{24}	—	March 8, 2000	Kitt Peak	Spacewatch	·	3.4 km	MPC · JPL
720229	2000 EV_{73}	—	March 10, 2000	Kitt Peak	Spacewatch	·	850 m	MPC · JPL
720230	2000 EX_{73}	—	March 10, 2000	Kitt Peak	Spacewatch	NYS	800 m	MPC · JPL
720231	2000 EG_{99}	—	March 3, 2000	Kitt Peak	Spacewatch	·	1.4 km	MPC · JPL
720232	2000 ER_{102}	—	March 14, 2000	Kitt Peak	Spacewatch	·	1.3 km	MPC · JPL
720233	2000 EE_{117}	—	March 3, 2000	Socorro	LINEAR	EUN	1.2 km	MPC · JPL
720234	2000 ES_{142}	—	March 3, 2000	Socorro	LINEAR	·	3.3 km	MPC · JPL
720235	2000 EK_{176}	—	March 3, 2000	Kitt Peak	Spacewatch	·	880 m	MPC · JPL
720236	2000 ER_{176}	—	March 3, 2000	Kitt Peak	Spacewatch	·	2.6 km	MPC · JPL
720237	2000 EZ_{177}	—	March 4, 2000	Kitt Peak	Spacewatch	EOS	2.0 km	MPC · JPL
720238	2000 ER_{189}	—	March 3, 2000	Socorro	LINEAR	·	2.8 km	MPC · JPL
720239	2000 EM_{208}	—	March 3, 2000	Kitt Peak	Spacewatch	NYS	950 m	MPC · JPL
720240	2000 ER_{209}	—	April 21, 2010	WISE	WISE	·	1.9 km	MPC · JPL
720241	2000 ET_{210}	—	March 17, 2010	WISE	WISE	·	2.0 km	MPC · JPL
720242	2000 EY_{211}	—	August 13, 2007	XuYi	PMO NEO Survey Program	·	2.4 km	MPC · JPL
720243	2000 FO_{74}	—	March 30, 2000	Kitt Peak	Spacewatch	·	2.4 km	MPC · JPL
720244	2000 GF_{21}	—	April 5, 2000	Socorro	LINEAR	·	1.5 km	MPC · JPL
720245	2000 GR_{22}	—	April 5, 2000	Socorro	LINEAR	·	3.5 km	MPC · JPL
720246	2000 GV_{118}	—	April 3, 2000	Kitt Peak	Spacewatch	(5)	970 m	MPC · JPL
720247	2000 GR_{130}	—	April 6, 2000	Kitt Peak	Spacewatch	·	2.4 km	MPC · JPL
720248	2000 GN_{151}	—	March 29, 2000	Kitt Peak	Spacewatch	·	620 m	MPC · JPL
720249	2000 GS_{175}	—	April 2, 2000	Kitt Peak	Spacewatch	·	1.4 km	MPC · JPL
720250	2000 GE_{183}	—	April 3, 2000	Kitt Peak	Spacewatch	·	830 m	MPC · JPL
720251	2000 HF_{6}	—	April 24, 2000	Kitt Peak	Spacewatch	·	2.7 km	MPC · JPL
720252	2000 HZ_{90}	—	April 30, 2000	Kitt Peak	Spacewatch	·	2.3 km	MPC · JPL
720253	2000 HF_{105}	—	January 20, 2015	Mount Lemmon	Mount Lemmon Survey	EOS	1.5 km	MPC · JPL
720254	2000 JX_{89}	—	March 14, 2005	Mount Lemmon	Mount Lemmon Survey	BRA	1.3 km	MPC · JPL
720255	2000 JS_{94}	—	November 20, 2003	Kitt Peak	Spacewatch	·	3.7 km	MPC · JPL
720256	2000 JT_{94}	—	September 26, 2012	Haleakala	Pan-STARRS 1	·	2.1 km	MPC · JPL
720257	2000 JU_{94}	—	December 21, 2014	Haleakala	Pan-STARRS 1	·	1.2 km	MPC · JPL
720258	2000 JG_{95}	—	November 7, 2010	Mount Lemmon	Mount Lemmon Survey	·	3.0 km	MPC · JPL
720259	2000 JN_{95}	—	January 12, 2016	Haleakala	Pan-STARRS 1	·	2.2 km	MPC · JPL
720260	2000 JA_{96}	—	August 10, 2013	Mount Lemmon	Mount Lemmon Survey	·	1.3 km	MPC · JPL
720261	2000 JJ_{96}	—	April 24, 2010	WISE	WISE	·	2.7 km	MPC · JPL
720262	2000 JS_{96}	—	January 21, 2012	Mount Lemmon	Mount Lemmon Survey	ADE	1.7 km	MPC · JPL
720263	2000 JU_{96}	—	February 9, 2016	Haleakala	Pan-STARRS 1	·	2.5 km	MPC · JPL
720264	2000 JZ_{96}	—	October 6, 2008	Mount Lemmon	Mount Lemmon Survey	·	2.5 km	MPC · JPL
720265	2000 JB_{97}	—	January 26, 2015	Haleakala	Pan-STARRS 1	·	2.8 km	MPC · JPL
720266	2000 JS_{97}	—	May 4, 2000	Apache Point	SDSS Collaboration	·	1.6 km	MPC · JPL
720267	2000 JT_{97}	—	June 24, 2014	Mount Lemmon	Mount Lemmon Survey	·	1.6 km	MPC · JPL
720268	2000 JZ_{97}	—	May 1, 2010	WISE	WISE	·	3.0 km	MPC · JPL
720269	2000 KW_{49}	—	May 30, 2000	Kitt Peak	Spacewatch	DOR	2.0 km	MPC · JPL
720270	2000 KY_{68}	—	May 29, 2000	Kitt Peak	Spacewatch	·	2.1 km	MPC · JPL
720271	2000 KR_{77}	—	May 27, 2000	Socorro	LINEAR	(18466)	2.7 km	MPC · JPL
720272	2000 KH_{84}	—	May 24, 2000	Mauna Kea	C. Veillet, D. D. Balam	·	1.8 km	MPC · JPL
720273	2000 KY_{84}	—	March 7, 2022	Haleakala	Pan-STARRS 2	TIR	2.4 km	MPC · JPL
720274	2000 LA_{38}	—	April 23, 2010	WISE	WISE	·	2.5 km	MPC · JPL
720275	2000 OD_{57}	—	August 1, 2000	Socorro	LINEAR	·	940 m	MPC · JPL
720276	2000 OT_{70}	—	September 3, 2000	Kitt Peak	Spacewatch	·	580 m	MPC · JPL
720277	2000 OO_{71}	—	November 13, 2017	Haleakala	Pan-STARRS 1	·	820 m	MPC · JPL
720278	2000 OX_{71}	—	December 14, 2001	Kitt Peak	Spacewatch	PHO	940 m	MPC · JPL
720279	2000 OJ_{72}	—	October 8, 2015	Haleakala	Pan-STARRS 1	AGN	940 m	MPC · JPL
720280	2000 OM_{72}	—	November 2, 2007	Kitt Peak	Spacewatch	·	600 m	MPC · JPL
720281	2000 OE_{73}	—	February 22, 2010	WISE	WISE	·	3.0 km	MPC · JPL
720282	2000 PV_{32}	—	November 24, 2008	Mount Lemmon	Mount Lemmon Survey	·	4.0 km	MPC · JPL
720283	2000 PY_{32}	—	February 10, 2015	Mount Lemmon	Mount Lemmon Survey	·	2.6 km	MPC · JPL
720284	2000 QR_{221}	—	August 26, 2000	Socorro	LINEAR	·	700 m	MPC · JPL
720285	2000 QK_{242}	—	August 27, 2000	Cerro Tololo	Deep Ecliptic Survey	·	4.8 km	MPC · JPL
720286	2000 QB_{253}	—	August 29, 2000	La Silla	Barbieri, C.	·	3.6 km	MPC · JPL
720287	2000 QS_{256}	—	June 20, 2015	Haleakala	Pan-STARRS 1	·	1.1 km	MPC · JPL
720288	2000 QW_{259}	—	January 26, 2012	Mount Lemmon	Mount Lemmon Survey	AGN	890 m	MPC · JPL
720289	2000 QA_{261}	—	February 1, 2009	Kitt Peak	Spacewatch	T_{j} (2.98)	2.9 km	MPC · JPL
720290	2000 RB_{57}	—	September 7, 2000	Kitt Peak	Spacewatch	L5	8.0 km	MPC · JPL
720291	2000 RP_{59}	—	September 7, 2000	Kitt Peak	Spacewatch	T_{j} (2.96)	3.5 km	MPC · JPL
720292	2000 RC_{108}	—	September 5, 2000	Kitt Peak	Spacewatch	·	920 m	MPC · JPL
720293	2000 RG_{108}	—	August 12, 2004	Palomar	NEAT	·	1.4 km	MPC · JPL
720294	2000 RJ_{108}	—	November 12, 2001	Apache Point	SDSS	L5	7.4 km	MPC · JPL
720295	2000 RQ_{108}	—	February 27, 2009	Mount Lemmon	Mount Lemmon Survey	·	2.4 km	MPC · JPL
720296	2000 RO_{110}	—	April 7, 2006	Kitt Peak	Spacewatch	·	510 m	MPC · JPL
720297	2000 RZ_{110}	—	February 7, 2008	Kitt Peak	Spacewatch	·	2.1 km	MPC · JPL
720298	2000 RE_{111}	—	September 21, 2009	Mount Lemmon	Mount Lemmon Survey	·	1.2 km	MPC · JPL
720299	2000 RD_{112}	—	August 17, 2012	Haleakala	Pan-STARRS 1	·	1.0 km	MPC · JPL
720300	2000 RO_{112}	—	February 27, 2007	Kitt Peak	Spacewatch	L5	8.0 km	MPC · JPL

== 720301–720400 ==
back to top

Designation			Discovery			Properties		Ref
Permanent	Provisional	Named after	Date	Site	Discoverer(s)	Category	Diam.	Ref
720301	2000 SK	—	September 19, 2000	Emerald Lane	L. Ball	·	580 m	MPC · JPL
720302	2000 SX_{7}	—	September 22, 2000	Kitt Peak	Spacewatch	·	2.3 km	MPC · JPL
720303	2000 SH_{21}	—	September 23, 2000	Socorro	LINEAR	T_{j} (2.99) · EUP	3.6 km	MPC · JPL
720304	2000 SK_{21}	—	September 24, 2000	Socorro	LINEAR	PHO	1.3 km	MPC · JPL
720305	2000 SN_{106}	—	September 24, 2000	Socorro	LINEAR	·	910 m	MPC · JPL
720306	2000 SK_{135}	—	September 23, 2000	Socorro	LINEAR	·	680 m	MPC · JPL
720307	2000 SG_{247}	—	September 24, 2000	Socorro	LINEAR	·	1.0 km	MPC · JPL
720308	2000 SB_{254}	—	September 24, 2000	Socorro	LINEAR	·	2.1 km	MPC · JPL
720309	2000 SA_{317}	—	September 30, 2000	Socorro	LINEAR	·	1.7 km	MPC · JPL
720310	2000 SZ_{317}	—	August 5, 2000	Haleakala	NEAT	(1547)	2.0 km	MPC · JPL
720311	2000 SR_{334}	—	September 26, 2000	Haleakala	NEAT	·	940 m	MPC · JPL
720312	2000 SA_{373}	—	September 10, 2004	Kitt Peak	Spacewatch	MAR	830 m	MPC · JPL
720313	2000 SH_{377}	—	July 27, 2015	Haleakala	Pan-STARRS 1	·	1.9 km	MPC · JPL
720314	2000 SY_{377}	—	December 29, 2008	Mount Lemmon	Mount Lemmon Survey	SYL	3.7 km	MPC · JPL
720315	2000 SA_{378}	—	March 1, 2012	Mount Lemmon	Mount Lemmon Survey	·	650 m	MPC · JPL
720316	2000 SU_{379}	—	September 19, 2006	Kitt Peak	Spacewatch	·	2.4 km	MPC · JPL
720317	2000 SH_{380}	—	October 9, 2016	Mount Lemmon	Mount Lemmon Survey	EOS	1.3 km	MPC · JPL
720318	2000 SF_{381}	—	May 1, 2010	WISE	WISE	·	2.4 km	MPC · JPL
720319	2000 SC_{382}	—	April 16, 1994	Kitt Peak	Spacewatch	·	1.6 km	MPC · JPL
720320	2000 ST_{382}	—	December 25, 2017	Haleakala	Pan-STARRS 1	MAR	770 m	MPC · JPL
720321	2000 SF_{384}	—	November 4, 2011	Mount Lemmon	Mount Lemmon Survey	·	1.4 km	MPC · JPL
720322	2000 SW_{384}	—	April 25, 2015	Haleakala	Pan-STARRS 1	·	710 m	MPC · JPL
720323	2000 SR_{385}	—	October 17, 2010	Mount Lemmon	Mount Lemmon Survey	·	1.5 km	MPC · JPL
720324	2000 SY_{385}	—	September 26, 2006	Kitt Peak	Spacewatch	·	2.7 km	MPC · JPL
720325	2000 SA_{386}	—	November 10, 2006	Kitt Peak	Spacewatch	THM	2.0 km	MPC · JPL
720326	2000 SR_{386}	—	September 23, 2000	Kitt Peak	Spacewatch	·	830 m	MPC · JPL
720327	2000 TF_{75}	—	April 29, 2003	Kitt Peak	Spacewatch	·	2.5 km	MPC · JPL
720328	2000 TJ_{75}	—	November 27, 2009	Kitt Peak	Spacewatch	·	1.2 km	MPC · JPL
720329	2000 TA_{76}	—	July 9, 2015	Haleakala	Pan-STARRS 1	EOS	2.0 km	MPC · JPL
720330	2000 TK_{76}	—	June 19, 2010	Mount Lemmon	Mount Lemmon Survey	·	2.0 km	MPC · JPL
720331	2000 TT_{76}	—	September 23, 2012	Mount Lemmon	Mount Lemmon Survey	L5 · (291316)	8.0 km	MPC · JPL
720332	2000 TR_{77}	—	February 4, 2009	Mount Lemmon	Mount Lemmon Survey	·	2.4 km	MPC · JPL
720333	2000 TL_{78}	—	October 1, 2000	Apache Point	SDSS Collaboration	BRA	1.3 km	MPC · JPL
720334	2000 TD_{79}	—	October 6, 2000	Kitt Peak	Spacewatch	BRA	1.2 km	MPC · JPL
720335	2000 TH_{79}	—	October 26, 2016	Mount Lemmon	Mount Lemmon Survey	·	1.8 km	MPC · JPL
720336	2000 TN_{79}	—	April 15, 2007	Kitt Peak	Spacewatch	·	840 m	MPC · JPL
720337	2000 TC_{81}	—	May 23, 2010	WISE	WISE	·	3.2 km	MPC · JPL
720338	2000 TF_{81}	—	October 31, 2006	Kitt Peak	Spacewatch	·	1.9 km	MPC · JPL
720339	2000 UH	—	October 18, 2000	Socorro	LINEAR	T_{j} (2.89)	4.2 km	MPC · JPL
720340	2000 UH_{115}	—	October 19, 2000	Kitt Peak	Spacewatch	·	510 m	MPC · JPL
720341	2000 UH_{116}	—	October 27, 2011	Mount Lemmon	Mount Lemmon Survey	·	1.9 km	MPC · JPL
720342	2000 VH_{41}	—	November 1, 2000	Socorro	LINEAR	·	3.7 km	MPC · JPL
720343	2000 VT_{65}	—	March 21, 2009	Mount Lemmon	Mount Lemmon Survey	·	700 m	MPC · JPL
720344	2000 VO_{66}	—	November 1, 2000	Kitt Peak	Spacewatch	EOS	1.5 km	MPC · JPL
720345	2000 WO_{53}	—	November 27, 2000	Kitt Peak	Spacewatch	·	3.1 km	MPC · JPL
720346	2000 WN_{67}	—	November 27, 2000	Socorro	LINEAR	·	1.2 km	MPC · JPL
720347	2000 WC_{79}	—	November 20, 2000	Socorro	LINEAR	·	4.2 km	MPC · JPL
720348	2000 WK_{194}	—	November 25, 2000	Kitt Peak	Deep Lens Survey	·	1.4 km	MPC · JPL
720349	2000 WZ_{198}	—	November 16, 2000	Kitt Peak	Spacewatch	·	2.1 km	MPC · JPL
720350	2000 WB_{199}	—	January 8, 2010	Catalina	CSS	·	1.9 km	MPC · JPL
720351	2000 WN_{199}	—	June 4, 2011	Mount Lemmon	Mount Lemmon Survey	HNS	1.0 km	MPC · JPL
720352	2000 WS_{200}	—	December 11, 2012	Mount Lemmon	Mount Lemmon Survey	·	1.2 km	MPC · JPL
720353	2000 WD_{201}	—	November 2, 2007	Kitt Peak	Spacewatch	·	640 m	MPC · JPL
720354	2000 WD_{204}	—	August 19, 2015	Kitt Peak	Spacewatch	EOS	1.6 km	MPC · JPL
720355	2000 WN_{204}	—	October 23, 2012	Mount Lemmon	Mount Lemmon Survey	·	3.8 km	MPC · JPL
720356	2000 WS_{204}	—	January 28, 2014	Kitt Peak	Spacewatch	(5)	820 m	MPC · JPL
720357	2000 WA_{205}	—	January 3, 2016	Haleakala	Pan-STARRS 1	·	1.6 km	MPC · JPL
720358	2000 WD_{205}	—	November 27, 2006	Kitt Peak	Spacewatch	(1298)	2.3 km	MPC · JPL
720359	2000 WE_{205}	—	October 1, 2008	Kitt Peak	Spacewatch	·	740 m	MPC · JPL
720360	2000 XD_{44}	—	December 6, 2000	Bohyunsan	Jeon, Y.-B., Park, Y.-H.	TIR	2.1 km	MPC · JPL
720361	2000 YC_{21}	—	December 28, 2000	Kitt Peak	Spacewatch	·	2.1 km	MPC · JPL
720362	2000 YX_{140}	—	December 19, 2000	Kitt Peak	Deep Lens Survey	TRE	1.8 km	MPC · JPL
720363	2000 YH_{144}	—	October 1, 2008	Siding Spring	SSS	·	1.8 km	MPC · JPL
720364	2000 YE_{145}	—	October 13, 2016	Mount Lemmon	Mount Lemmon Survey	EUN	1.0 km	MPC · JPL
720365	2001 AO_{54}	—	September 28, 2009	Mount Lemmon	Mount Lemmon Survey	L4	8.3 km	MPC · JPL
720366	2001 BD_{36}	—	January 19, 2001	Socorro	LINEAR	·	1.2 km	MPC · JPL
720367	2001 BA_{84}	—	November 26, 2014	Haleakala	Pan-STARRS 1	PHO	740 m	MPC · JPL
720368	2001 BO_{84}	—	November 1, 2014	Mount Lemmon	Mount Lemmon Survey	V	480 m	MPC · JPL
720369	2001 BU_{84}	—	October 25, 2005	Mount Lemmon	Mount Lemmon Survey	H	430 m	MPC · JPL
720370	2001 CE_{50}	—	July 7, 2010	WISE	WISE	·	3.0 km	MPC · JPL
720371	2001 CL_{50}	—	January 7, 2013	Haleakala	Pan-STARRS 1	(5)	1.1 km	MPC · JPL
720372	2001 CP_{50}	—	June 24, 2010	WISE	WISE	·	3.7 km	MPC · JPL
720373	2001 CT_{50}	—	November 20, 2012	Catalina	CSS	·	900 m	MPC · JPL
720374	2001 CA_{51}	—	August 1, 2011	Haleakala	Pan-STARRS 1	·	1.4 km	MPC · JPL
720375	2001 DB_{11}	—	February 17, 2001	Socorro	LINEAR	(5)	1.4 km	MPC · JPL
720376	2001 DX_{60}	—	February 19, 2001	Socorro	LINEAR	·	1.3 km	MPC · JPL
720377	2001 DH_{111}	—	March 27, 2011	Kitt Peak	Spacewatch	·	2.1 km	MPC · JPL
720378	2001 DW_{111}	—	February 15, 2001	La Palma	D. D. Balam	·	1.7 km	MPC · JPL
720379	2001 DG_{113}	—	March 16, 2001	Kitt Peak	Spacewatch	·	1.1 km	MPC · JPL
720380	2001 DX_{113}	—	February 28, 2014	Haleakala	Pan-STARRS 1	·	1.1 km	MPC · JPL
720381	2001 DZ_{113}	—	February 28, 2008	Kitt Peak	Spacewatch	·	570 m	MPC · JPL
720382	2001 DD_{114}	—	July 12, 2010	WISE	WISE	·	2.5 km	MPC · JPL
720383	2001 DM_{114}	—	September 5, 1999	Catalina	CSS	·	2.3 km	MPC · JPL
720384	2001 DX_{114}	—	July 31, 2014	Haleakala	Pan-STARRS 1	EOS	1.6 km	MPC · JPL
720385	2001 DG_{115}	—	February 14, 2012	Haleakala	Pan-STARRS 1	·	950 m	MPC · JPL
720386	2001 DJ_{115}	—	August 29, 2016	Mount Lemmon	Mount Lemmon Survey	·	530 m	MPC · JPL
720387	2001 DN_{115}	—	October 22, 2009	Mount Lemmon	Mount Lemmon Survey	·	1.8 km	MPC · JPL
720388	2001 DO_{115}	—	August 8, 2013	Haleakala	Pan-STARRS 1	·	1.7 km	MPC · JPL
720389	2001 DQ_{115}	—	February 29, 2012	Mount Lemmon	Mount Lemmon Survey	EOS	1.6 km	MPC · JPL
720390	2001 DS_{116}	—	May 7, 2002	Kitt Peak	Spacewatch	·	1.6 km	MPC · JPL
720391	2001 DT_{116}	—	February 25, 2008	Mount Lemmon	Mount Lemmon Survey	NYS	660 m	MPC · JPL
720392	2001 DW_{116}	—	October 2, 2006	Mount Lemmon	Mount Lemmon Survey	·	1.3 km	MPC · JPL
720393	2001 DN_{117}	—	November 21, 2017	Haleakala	Pan-STARRS 1	·	1.1 km	MPC · JPL
720394	2001 DW_{117}	—	January 19, 2010	WISE	WISE	·	1.9 km	MPC · JPL
720395	2001 DG_{118}	—	May 3, 2008	Kitt Peak	Spacewatch	·	2.7 km	MPC · JPL
720396	2001 EJ_{8}	—	February 27, 2001	Kitt Peak	Spacewatch	·	790 m	MPC · JPL
720397	2001 FX_{6}	—	March 19, 2001	Socorro	LINEAR	·	1 km	MPC · JPL
720398	2001 FX_{178}	—	March 20, 2001	Kitt Peak	Spacewatch	NYS	670 m	MPC · JPL
720399	2001 FF_{182}	—	March 23, 2001	Anderson Mesa	LONEOS	·	1.1 km	MPC · JPL
720400	2001 FR_{227}	—	March 22, 2001	Kitt Peak	SKADS	·	1.0 km	MPC · JPL

== 720401–720500 ==
back to top

Designation			Discovery			Properties		Ref
Permanent	Provisional	Named after	Date	Site	Discoverer(s)	Category	Diam.	Ref
720401	2001 FJ_{230}	—	October 30, 2002	Kitt Peak	Spacewatch	·	540 m	MPC · JPL
720402	2001 FR_{244}	—	March 19, 2001	Apache Point	SDSS Collaboration	·	990 m	MPC · JPL
720403	2001 FT_{244}	—	September 2, 2014	Haleakala	Pan-STARRS 1	·	2.7 km	MPC · JPL
720404	2001 FE_{245}	—	March 19, 2010	Mount Lemmon	Mount Lemmon Survey	·	2.0 km	MPC · JPL
720405	2001 FS_{245}	—	January 5, 2013	Mount Lemmon	Mount Lemmon Survey	·	1.2 km	MPC · JPL
720406	2001 FG_{246}	—	February 21, 2012	Mount Lemmon	Mount Lemmon Survey	EOS	1.9 km	MPC · JPL
720407	2001 FJ_{246}	—	May 19, 2012	Mount Lemmon	Mount Lemmon Survey	·	1.8 km	MPC · JPL
720408	2001 FM_{246}	—	October 9, 2008	Kitt Peak	Spacewatch	·	1.7 km	MPC · JPL
720409	2001 FO_{246}	—	October 8, 2015	Haleakala	Pan-STARRS 1	·	2.7 km	MPC · JPL
720410	2001 FQ_{246}	—	April 20, 2010	WISE	WISE	·	1.2 km	MPC · JPL
720411	2001 FS_{246}	—	September 21, 2003	Anderson Mesa	LONEOS	·	1.2 km	MPC · JPL
720412	2001 FT_{246}	—	February 17, 2010	Kitt Peak	Spacewatch	·	1.5 km	MPC · JPL
720413	2001 FU_{246}	—	February 22, 2010	WISE	WISE	·	1.6 km	MPC · JPL
720414	2001 FD_{247}	—	March 4, 2010	WISE	WISE	·	3.1 km	MPC · JPL
720415	2001 FF_{247}	—	January 18, 2010	WISE	WISE	·	2.4 km	MPC · JPL
720416	2001 FJ_{247}	—	September 16, 2009	Mount Lemmon	Mount Lemmon Survey	L4	9.6 km	MPC · JPL
720417	2001 FP_{247}	—	January 20, 2010	WISE	WISE	L4	9.1 km	MPC · JPL
720418	2001 FL_{248}	—	March 22, 2001	Kitt Peak	Spacewatch	·	2.0 km	MPC · JPL
720419	2001 GQ_{5}	—	March 21, 2001	Anderson Mesa	LONEOS	·	980 m	MPC · JPL
720420	2001 HO_{30}	—	April 26, 2001	Kitt Peak	Spacewatch	·	2.9 km	MPC · JPL
720421	2001 HA_{68}	—	April 30, 2001	Kitt Peak	Spacewatch	·	2.9 km	MPC · JPL
720422	2001 HQ_{68}	—	April 7, 2008	Kitt Peak	Spacewatch	·	550 m	MPC · JPL
720423	2001 HX_{68}	—	February 14, 2005	Catalina	CSS	·	1.2 km	MPC · JPL
720424	2001 HZ_{68}	—	July 4, 2010	WISE	WISE	·	1.6 km	MPC · JPL
720425	2001 JJ_{11}	—	June 4, 2014	Haleakala	Pan-STARRS 1	EUN	870 m	MPC · JPL
720426	2001 JM_{11}	—	April 6, 2017	Mount Lemmon	Mount Lemmon Survey	·	2.2 km	MPC · JPL
720427	2001 KL_{32}	—	May 24, 2001	Kitt Peak	Spacewatch	·	2.7 km	MPC · JPL
720428	2001 KB_{80}	—	March 2, 2010	WISE	WISE	·	3.0 km	MPC · JPL
720429	2001 KT_{80}	—	January 16, 2015	Haleakala	Pan-STARRS 1	·	1.0 km	MPC · JPL
720430	2001 KL_{81}	—	February 28, 2008	Mount Lemmon	Mount Lemmon Survey	MAS	560 m	MPC · JPL
720431	2001 KO_{82}	—	August 10, 2015	Haleakala	Pan-STARRS 1	·	1.4 km	MPC · JPL
720432	2001 KO_{84}	—	March 19, 2013	Haleakala	Pan-STARRS 1	·	1.1 km	MPC · JPL
720433	2001 KD_{85}	—	September 12, 2015	Haleakala	Pan-STARRS 1	·	1.4 km	MPC · JPL
720434	2001 KA_{86}	—	May 3, 2010	WISE	WISE	·	1.2 km	MPC · JPL
720435	2001 KF_{87}	—	February 8, 2013	Haleakala	Pan-STARRS 1	·	1.6 km	MPC · JPL
720436	2001 KS_{87}	—	March 5, 2013	Haleakala	Pan-STARRS 1	·	1.6 km	MPC · JPL
720437	2001 KQ_{88}	—	May 14, 2010	WISE	WISE	·	1.7 km	MPC · JPL
720438	2001 LE_{20}	—	November 25, 2009	Mount Lemmon	Mount Lemmon Survey	ELF	3.4 km	MPC · JPL
720439	2001 MS_{31}	—	January 3, 2011	Mount Lemmon	Mount Lemmon Survey	·	2.9 km	MPC · JPL
720440	2001 MX_{31}	—	June 6, 2010	WISE	WISE	·	1.7 km	MPC · JPL
720441	2001 MC_{32}	—	October 22, 2016	Mount Lemmon	Mount Lemmon Survey	PHO	1.2 km	MPC · JPL
720442	2001 OX_{12}	—	June 23, 2001	Palomar	NEAT	·	3.4 km	MPC · JPL
720443	2001 OF_{17}	—	July 21, 2001	Ondřejov	P. Pravec, L. Kotková	·	850 m	MPC · JPL
720444	2001 OV_{38}	—	July 20, 2001	Palomar	NEAT	·	3.1 km	MPC · JPL
720445	2001 OD_{40}	—	July 20, 2001	Palomar	NEAT	·	3.5 km	MPC · JPL
720446	2001 OE_{59}	—	June 29, 2001	Haleakala	NEAT	·	2.0 km	MPC · JPL
720447	2001 OM_{114}	—	July 29, 2001	Palomar	NEAT	·	2.1 km	MPC · JPL
720448	2001 OP_{114}	—	July 18, 2006	Siding Spring	SSS	·	2.1 km	MPC · JPL
720449	2001 OQ_{114}	—	March 31, 2008	Mount Lemmon	Mount Lemmon Survey	·	990 m	MPC · JPL
720450	2001 PC	—	July 13, 2001	Palomar	NEAT	·	2.5 km	MPC · JPL
720451	2001 PS_{4}	—	August 5, 2001	Haleakala	NEAT	·	1.2 km	MPC · JPL
720452	2001 PE_{8}	—	August 11, 2001	Palomar	NEAT	·	1.4 km	MPC · JPL
720453	2001 PM_{31}	—	August 10, 2001	Palomar	NEAT	EUN	1.2 km	MPC · JPL
720454	2001 PR_{51}	—	August 15, 2001	Haleakala	NEAT	PHO	980 m	MPC · JPL
720455	2001 QS_{2}	—	August 15, 2001	Haleakala	NEAT	·	990 m	MPC · JPL
720456	2001 QU_{2}	—	July 24, 2001	Haleakala	NEAT	·	1.2 km	MPC · JPL
720457	2001 QJ_{9}	—	June 27, 2001	Haleakala	NEAT	·	2.3 km	MPC · JPL
720458	2001 QJ_{133}	—	July 16, 2001	Haleakala	NEAT	·	680 m	MPC · JPL
720459	2001 QS_{145}	—	August 25, 2001	Kitt Peak	Spacewatch	·	3.1 km	MPC · JPL
720460	2001 QC_{173}	—	August 25, 2001	Socorro	LINEAR	·	1.5 km	MPC · JPL
720461	2001 QF_{178}	—	August 11, 2001	Haleakala	NEAT	·	1.5 km	MPC · JPL
720462	2001 QU_{190}	—	August 16, 2001	Palomar	NEAT	·	1.5 km	MPC · JPL
720463	2001 QD_{207}	—	August 23, 2001	Socorro	LINEAR	·	4.6 km	MPC · JPL
720464	2001 QX_{302}	—	August 19, 2001	Cerro Tololo	Deep Ecliptic Survey	V	510 m	MPC · JPL
720465	2001 QA_{305}	—	August 19, 2001	Cerro Tololo	Deep Ecliptic Survey	·	1.0 km	MPC · JPL
720466	2001 QU_{311}	—	August 20, 2001	Cerro Tololo	Deep Ecliptic Survey	·	850 m	MPC · JPL
720467	2001 QB_{334}	—	October 7, 2007	Mount Lemmon	Mount Lemmon Survey	·	2.2 km	MPC · JPL
720468	2001 QK_{334}	—	May 23, 2001	Cerro Tololo	Deep Ecliptic Survey	·	1.5 km	MPC · JPL
720469	2001 QY_{334}	—	August 17, 2001	Palomar	NEAT	·	1.3 km	MPC · JPL
720470	2001 QX_{335}	—	August 26, 2001	Anderson Mesa	LONEOS	·	4.5 km	MPC · JPL
720471	2001 QC_{336}	—	August 1, 2001	Palomar	NEAT	·	1.8 km	MPC · JPL
720472	2001 QG_{336}	—	August 17, 2012	Haleakala	Pan-STARRS 1	·	1.1 km	MPC · JPL
720473	2001 QM_{336}	—	September 11, 2007	Mount Lemmon	Mount Lemmon Survey	VER	2.7 km	MPC · JPL
720474	2001 QL_{338}	—	August 23, 2001	Kitt Peak	Spacewatch	·	2.7 km	MPC · JPL
720475	2001 QM_{338}	—	August 23, 2001	Kitt Peak	Spacewatch	·	1.4 km	MPC · JPL
720476	2001 RA_{56}	—	September 12, 2001	Socorro	LINEAR	NYS	910 m	MPC · JPL
720477	2001 RN_{150}	—	September 11, 2001	Anderson Mesa	LONEOS	·	1.6 km	MPC · JPL
720478	2001 RU_{156}	—	June 15, 2010	WISE	WISE	·	1.8 km	MPC · JPL
720479	2001 RD_{158}	—	September 28, 2011	Mount Lemmon	Mount Lemmon Survey	·	490 m	MPC · JPL
720480	2001 ST_{92}	—	September 20, 2001	Socorro	LINEAR	·	3.6 km	MPC · JPL
720481	2001 SM_{170}	—	September 16, 2001	Socorro	LINEAR	·	1.7 km	MPC · JPL
720482	2001 SC_{199}	—	August 25, 2001	Kitt Peak	Spacewatch	·	2.7 km	MPC · JPL
720483	2001 SQ_{210}	—	September 18, 2001	Kitt Peak	Spacewatch	V	610 m	MPC · JPL
720484	2001 SF_{295}	—	September 20, 2001	Socorro	LINEAR	·	2.0 km	MPC · JPL
720485	2001 SP_{298}	—	September 11, 2001	Kitt Peak	Spacewatch	·	2.3 km	MPC · JPL
720486	2001 SH_{299}	—	August 24, 2001	Kitt Peak	Spacewatch	·	760 m	MPC · JPL
720487	2001 SG_{302}	—	September 20, 2001	Socorro	LINEAR	AEO	1.0 km	MPC · JPL
720488	2001 SR_{308}	—	September 22, 2001	Socorro	LINEAR	·	2.2 km	MPC · JPL
720489	2001 SQ_{322}	—	September 25, 2001	Socorro	LINEAR	·	4.8 km	MPC · JPL
720490	2001 SA_{323}	—	September 25, 2001	Socorro	LINEAR	·	1.9 km	MPC · JPL
720491	2001 SK_{351}	—	October 23, 2001	Palomar	NEAT	·	1.1 km	MPC · JPL
720492	2001 SH_{355}	—	September 18, 2001	Apache Point	SDSS	·	1.9 km	MPC · JPL
720493	2001 SB_{356}	—	October 25, 2005	Kitt Peak	Spacewatch	·	1.1 km	MPC · JPL
720494	2001 SX_{356}	—	August 7, 2010	WISE	WISE	·	2.3 km	MPC · JPL
720495	2001 SC_{357}	—	December 5, 2002	Kitt Peak	Spacewatch	·	1.7 km	MPC · JPL
720496	2001 SD_{357}	—	October 15, 2001	Palomar	NEAT	EOS	1.9 km	MPC · JPL
720497	2001 SR_{357}	—	February 8, 2011	Mount Lemmon	Mount Lemmon Survey	MAS	640 m	MPC · JPL
720498	2001 SU_{357}	—	February 21, 2003	Palomar	NEAT	·	1.0 km	MPC · JPL
720499	2001 SF_{358}	—	January 1, 2009	Kitt Peak	Spacewatch	VER	2.9 km	MPC · JPL
720500	2001 SY_{358}	—	March 10, 2011	Kitt Peak	Spacewatch	·	940 m	MPC · JPL

== 720501–720600 ==
back to top

Designation			Discovery			Properties		Ref
Permanent	Provisional	Named after	Date	Site	Discoverer(s)	Category	Diam.	Ref
720501	2001 SZ_{358}	—	March 8, 2011	Mount Lemmon	Mount Lemmon Survey	NYS	1.0 km	MPC · JPL
720502	2001 SK_{359}	—	August 28, 2014	Haleakala	Pan-STARRS 1	·	1.5 km	MPC · JPL
720503	2001 SB_{361}	—	November 9, 2009	Kitt Peak	Spacewatch	·	1.0 km	MPC · JPL
720504	2001 SG_{361}	—	November 17, 2006	Kitt Peak	Spacewatch	·	1.3 km	MPC · JPL
720505	2001 SV_{361}	—	September 14, 2007	Mount Lemmon	Mount Lemmon Survey	·	2.1 km	MPC · JPL
720506	2001 SA_{362}	—	October 1, 2014	Haleakala	Pan-STARRS 1	·	1.5 km	MPC · JPL
720507	2001 SU_{362}	—	November 22, 2017	Haleakala	Pan-STARRS 1	·	970 m	MPC · JPL
720508	2001 SB_{363}	—	September 22, 2001	Kitt Peak	Spacewatch	·	2.6 km	MPC · JPL
720509	2001 SK_{363}	—	September 21, 2001	Apache Point	SDSS Collaboration	·	3.2 km	MPC · JPL
720510	2001 SM_{363}	—	January 18, 2016	Haleakala	Pan-STARRS 1	·	3.1 km	MPC · JPL
720511	2001 SO_{363}	—	September 18, 2001	Kitt Peak	Spacewatch	·	680 m	MPC · JPL
720512	2001 SG_{364}	—	September 28, 2001	Palomar	NEAT	URS	3.2 km	MPC · JPL
720513	2001 SJ_{364}	—	September 21, 2001	Apache Point	SDSS Collaboration	L5	7.2 km	MPC · JPL
720514	2001 SC_{365}	—	September 20, 2001	Apache Point	SDSS Collaboration	·	1.5 km	MPC · JPL
720515	2001 TU_{96}	—	October 11, 2001	Palomar	NEAT	·	1.4 km	MPC · JPL
720516	2001 TN_{144}	—	October 10, 2001	Palomar	NEAT	·	1 km	MPC · JPL
720517	2001 TQ_{156}	—	October 14, 2001	Kitt Peak	Spacewatch	·	1.1 km	MPC · JPL
720518	2001 TT_{157}	—	October 15, 2001	Kitt Peak	Spacewatch	EMA	4.2 km	MPC · JPL
720519	2001 TR_{177}	—	October 14, 2001	Socorro	LINEAR	DOR	2.0 km	MPC · JPL
720520	2001 TD_{210}	—	August 26, 2001	Anderson Mesa	LONEOS	·	1.7 km	MPC · JPL
720521	2001 TT_{232}	—	October 15, 2001	Kitt Peak	Spacewatch	·	2.2 km	MPC · JPL
720522	2001 TV_{246}	—	October 14, 2001	Apache Point	SDSS Collaboration	·	2.2 km	MPC · JPL
720523	2001 TK_{247}	—	September 12, 2001	Kitt Peak	Deep Ecliptic Survey	·	1.3 km	MPC · JPL
720524	2001 TA_{259}	—	October 18, 2001	Kitt Peak	Spacewatch	·	830 m	MPC · JPL
720525	2001 TT_{260}	—	October 14, 2001	Apache Point	SDSS	·	1.1 km	MPC · JPL
720526	2001 TA_{262}	—	April 15, 2010	WISE	WISE	PHO	1.5 km	MPC · JPL
720527	2001 TB_{262}	—	August 18, 2009	Kitt Peak	Spacewatch	·	900 m	MPC · JPL
720528	2001 TF_{262}	—	October 15, 2001	Apache Point	SDSS	DOR	2.1 km	MPC · JPL
720529	2001 TR_{262}	—	April 1, 2008	Mount Lemmon	Mount Lemmon Survey	·	1.1 km	MPC · JPL
720530	2001 TN_{263}	—	January 31, 2003	Palomar	NEAT	·	3.8 km	MPC · JPL
720531	2001 TV_{263}	—	May 27, 2004	Kitt Peak	Spacewatch	PHO	910 m	MPC · JPL
720532	2001 TX_{263}	—	February 19, 2009	Mount Lemmon	Mount Lemmon Survey	·	1.6 km	MPC · JPL
720533	2001 TC_{264}	—	August 19, 2006	Kitt Peak	Spacewatch	·	2.1 km	MPC · JPL
720534	2001 TH_{265}	—	November 12, 2001	Apache Point	SDSS	·	810 m	MPC · JPL
720535	2001 TN_{265}	—	August 27, 2016	Haleakala	Pan-STARRS 1	·	1.1 km	MPC · JPL
720536	2001 TS_{265}	—	October 5, 2013	Haleakala	Pan-STARRS 1	·	2.6 km	MPC · JPL
720537	2001 TU_{267}	—	May 3, 2010	WISE	WISE	·	1.8 km	MPC · JPL
720538	2001 TB_{268}	—	July 8, 2010	WISE	WISE	·	2.6 km	MPC · JPL
720539	2001 TT_{268}	—	August 20, 2001	Cerro Tololo	Deep Ecliptic Survey	·	1.3 km	MPC · JPL
720540	2001 TU_{269}	—	October 14, 2001	Apache Point	SDSS Collaboration	VER	2.1 km	MPC · JPL
720541	2001 UW_{18}	—	October 16, 2001	Palomar	NEAT	·	910 m	MPC · JPL
720542	2001 US_{68}	—	October 16, 2001	Kitt Peak	Spacewatch	·	3.6 km	MPC · JPL
720543	2001 UB_{96}	—	October 17, 2001	Socorro	LINEAR	·	2.5 km	MPC · JPL
720544	2001 UM_{104}	—	October 17, 2001	Socorro	LINEAR	·	2.0 km	MPC · JPL
720545	2001 UP_{191}	—	October 18, 2001	Kitt Peak	Spacewatch	·	1.9 km	MPC · JPL
720546	2001 UP_{198}	—	October 21, 2001	Socorro	LINEAR	·	590 m	MPC · JPL
720547	2001 UJ_{208}	—	October 20, 2001	Kitt Peak	Spacewatch	·	2.8 km	MPC · JPL
720548	2001 UD_{209}	—	October 20, 2001	Socorro	LINEAR	3:2 · SHU	4.8 km	MPC · JPL
720549 Cırık	2001 US_{224}	Cırık	October 21, 2001	Palomar	NEAT	EOS	1.7 km	MPC · JPL
720550	2001 UW_{228}	—	October 16, 2001	Palomar	NEAT	·	560 m	MPC · JPL
720551	2001 UT_{230}	—	October 25, 2001	Apache Point	SDSS Collaboration	·	1.7 km	MPC · JPL
720552	2001 UG_{232}	—	September 16, 2001	Socorro	LINEAR	·	1.6 km	MPC · JPL
720553	2001 UQ_{232}	—	June 8, 2005	Kitt Peak	Spacewatch	EOS	2.9 km	MPC · JPL
720554	2001 US_{232}	—	October 23, 2001	Palomar	NEAT	L5	10 km	MPC · JPL
720555	2001 UB_{233}	—	November 1, 2008	Mount Lemmon	Mount Lemmon Survey	·	580 m	MPC · JPL
720556	2001 UB_{234}	—	September 13, 2013	Catalina	CSS	·	1.2 km	MPC · JPL
720557	2001 UL_{236}	—	October 19, 2001	Palomar	NEAT	·	1.3 km	MPC · JPL
720558	2001 UU_{236}	—	October 14, 2010	Bergisch Gladbach	W. Bickel	·	1.6 km	MPC · JPL
720559	2001 UV_{236}	—	February 28, 2014	Haleakala	Pan-STARRS 1	·	1.8 km	MPC · JPL
720560	2001 UW_{236}	—	March 28, 2008	Mount Lemmon	Mount Lemmon Survey	·	1.4 km	MPC · JPL
720561	2001 UD_{237}	—	November 2, 2015	Haleakala	Pan-STARRS 1	·	1.5 km	MPC · JPL
720562	2001 US_{237}	—	September 17, 2012	Mount Lemmon	Mount Lemmon Survey	·	2.3 km	MPC · JPL
720563	2001 US_{239}	—	November 25, 2005	Mount Lemmon	Mount Lemmon Survey	MAS	600 m	MPC · JPL
720564	2001 UV_{239}	—	February 10, 2011	Mount Lemmon	Mount Lemmon Survey	·	1.1 km	MPC · JPL
720565	2001 VJ_{7}	—	October 21, 2001	Socorro	LINEAR	·	1.9 km	MPC · JPL
720566	2001 VT_{127}	—	October 16, 2001	Cima Ekar	ADAS	·	1.8 km	MPC · JPL
720567	2001 VN_{128}	—	November 11, 2001	Apache Point	SDSS Collaboration	·	7.2 km	MPC · JPL
720568	2001 VG_{129}	—	November 11, 2001	Apache Point	SDSS Collaboration	3:2	6.3 km	MPC · JPL
720569	2001 VZ_{129}	—	October 23, 2001	Palomar	NEAT	BRA	1.2 km	MPC · JPL
720570	2001 VK_{130}	—	January 10, 2003	Kitt Peak	Spacewatch	EOS	2.0 km	MPC · JPL
720571	2001 VQ_{131}	—	November 11, 2001	Apache Point	SDSS Collaboration	PHO	980 m	MPC · JPL
720572	2001 VU_{133}	—	November 12, 2001	Apache Point	SDSS	·	2.2 km	MPC · JPL
720573	2001 VO_{134}	—	February 22, 2009	Kitt Peak	Spacewatch	·	2.0 km	MPC · JPL
720574	2001 VW_{134}	—	January 8, 2002	Apache Point	SDSS	EOS	1.4 km	MPC · JPL
720575	2001 VH_{135}	—	December 25, 2013	Mount Lemmon	Mount Lemmon Survey	·	2.4 km	MPC · JPL
720576	2001 VP_{135}	—	November 12, 2001	Apache Point	SDSS Collaboration	·	1.7 km	MPC · JPL
720577	2001 VK_{136}	—	September 14, 2005	Kitt Peak	Spacewatch	·	1.1 km	MPC · JPL
720578	2001 VV_{136}	—	March 24, 2015	Mount Lemmon	Mount Lemmon Survey	·	2.4 km	MPC · JPL
720579	2001 VC_{137}	—	November 11, 2001	Apache Point	SDSS Collaboration	·	2.5 km	MPC · JPL
720580	2001 VM_{137}	—	January 3, 2017	Haleakala	Pan-STARRS 1	L5	7.0 km	MPC · JPL
720581	2001 VW_{137}	—	January 8, 2002	Apache Point	SDSS	·	1.9 km	MPC · JPL
720582	2001 VN_{138}	—	November 11, 2001	Apache Point	SDSS Collaboration	L5	7.7 km	MPC · JPL
720583	2001 WW_{15}	—	November 13, 2001	Haleakala	NEAT	H	550 m	MPC · JPL
720584	2001 WJ_{22}	—	November 16, 2001	Kitt Peak	Deep Lens Survey	·	1.3 km	MPC · JPL
720585	2001 WU_{22}	—	October 21, 2001	Socorro	LINEAR	ADE	1.4 km	MPC · JPL
720586	2001 WR_{78}	—	November 20, 2001	Socorro	LINEAR	·	970 m	MPC · JPL
720587	2001 WE_{97}	—	November 18, 2001	Kitt Peak	Spacewatch	·	1.6 km	MPC · JPL
720588	2001 WL_{104}	—	October 13, 2001	Kitt Peak	Spacewatch	·	950 m	MPC · JPL
720589	2001 WQ_{104}	—	November 19, 2001	Anderson Mesa	LONEOS	MAS	600 m	MPC · JPL
720590	2001 WY_{104}	—	August 28, 2006	Kitt Peak	Spacewatch	·	1.9 km	MPC · JPL
720591	2001 WE_{105}	—	November 17, 2001	Kitt Peak	Deep Lens Survey	·	1.0 km	MPC · JPL
720592	2001 WZ_{106}	—	September 15, 2013	Haleakala	Pan-STARRS 1	L5	8.1 km	MPC · JPL
720593	2001 XU_{132}	—	December 14, 2001	Socorro	LINEAR	3:2 · SHU	4.8 km	MPC · JPL
720594	2001 XU_{246}	—	December 15, 2001	Socorro	LINEAR	·	1.9 km	MPC · JPL
720595	2001 XP_{261}	—	December 11, 2001	Socorro	LINEAR	·	6.9 km	MPC · JPL
720596	2001 XP_{264}	—	December 14, 2001	Kitt Peak	Spacewatch	H	440 m	MPC · JPL
720597	2001 XE_{268}	—	December 15, 2001	Apache Point	SDSS	·	1.3 km	MPC · JPL
720598	2001 XY_{268}	—	October 1, 2006	Kitt Peak	Spacewatch	·	3.2 km	MPC · JPL
720599	2001 XO_{269}	—	March 24, 2010	WISE	WISE	·	3.0 km	MPC · JPL
720600	2001 XR_{269}	—	March 12, 2005	Mount Lemmon	Mount Lemmon Survey	·	4.0 km	MPC · JPL

== 720601–720700 ==
back to top

Designation			Discovery			Properties		Ref
Permanent	Provisional	Named after	Date	Site	Discoverer(s)	Category	Diam.	Ref
720601	2001 XU_{269}	—	December 7, 2001	Kitt Peak	Spacewatch	ADE	1.6 km	MPC · JPL
720602	2001 YV_{40}	—	December 18, 2001	Socorro	LINEAR	·	2.4 km	MPC · JPL
720603	2001 YM_{43}	—	December 18, 2001	Socorro	LINEAR	EUN	1.1 km	MPC · JPL
720604	2001 YW_{59}	—	December 18, 2001	Socorro	LINEAR	·	1.2 km	MPC · JPL
720605	2001 YW_{92}	—	October 14, 2001	Socorro	LINEAR	·	2.5 km	MPC · JPL
720606	2001 YR_{150}	—	December 19, 2001	Socorro	LINEAR	TIR	2.8 km	MPC · JPL
720607	2001 YE_{162}	—	December 25, 2005	Kitt Peak	Spacewatch	·	830 m	MPC · JPL
720608	2001 YM_{162}	—	December 17, 2001	Kitt Peak	Spacewatch	·	960 m	MPC · JPL
720609	2001 YP_{162}	—	November 17, 2006	Mount Lemmon	Mount Lemmon Survey	·	3.6 km	MPC · JPL
720610	2001 YG_{163}	—	August 28, 2006	Kitt Peak	Spacewatch	·	2.3 km	MPC · JPL
720611	2001 YP_{164}	—	November 12, 2007	Mount Lemmon	Mount Lemmon Survey	EUP	2.9 km	MPC · JPL
720612	2001 YB_{165}	—	November 17, 2009	Kitt Peak	Spacewatch	·	860 m	MPC · JPL
720613	2001 YJ_{165}	—	February 26, 2010	WISE	WISE	·	4.5 km	MPC · JPL
720614	2002 AA_{34}	—	December 10, 2001	Kitt Peak	Spacewatch	·	2.8 km	MPC · JPL
720615	2002 AY_{75}	—	January 8, 2002	Socorro	LINEAR	·	810 m	MPC · JPL
720616	2002 AS_{146}	—	January 13, 2002	Kitt Peak	Spacewatch	·	3.0 km	MPC · JPL
720617	2002 AF_{174}	—	January 6, 2002	Kitt Peak	Spacewatch	·	1.1 km	MPC · JPL
720618	2002 AZ_{183}	—	January 6, 2002	Kitt Peak	Spacewatch	·	1.9 km	MPC · JPL
720619	2002 AW_{207}	—	January 13, 2002	Kitt Peak	Spacewatch	·	960 m	MPC · JPL
720620	2002 AE_{209}	—	January 8, 2002	Palomar	NEAT	·	2.0 km	MPC · JPL
720621	2002 AD_{210}	—	January 5, 2002	Anderson Mesa	LONEOS	·	1.7 km	MPC · JPL
720622	2002 AW_{210}	—	March 24, 2014	Haleakala	Pan-STARRS 1	·	2.6 km	MPC · JPL
720623	2002 AA_{211}	—	October 13, 2005	Kitt Peak	Spacewatch	·	2.0 km	MPC · JPL
720624	2002 AX_{211}	—	December 17, 2007	Mount Lemmon	Mount Lemmon Survey	·	1.8 km	MPC · JPL
720625	2002 AJ_{212}	—	July 14, 2010	WISE	WISE	·	3.0 km	MPC · JPL
720626	2002 AT_{212}	—	September 12, 2007	Mount Lemmon	Mount Lemmon Survey	·	460 m	MPC · JPL
720627	2002 AK_{214}	—	May 28, 2010	WISE	WISE	·	3.8 km	MPC · JPL
720628	2002 AY_{214}	—	October 13, 2017	Mount Lemmon	Mount Lemmon Survey	·	2.2 km	MPC · JPL
720629	2002 AM_{215}	—	January 5, 2013	Mount Lemmon	Mount Lemmon Survey	L4	7.2 km	MPC · JPL
720630	2002 AS_{215}	—	February 15, 2013	Haleakala	Pan-STARRS 1	·	1.7 km	MPC · JPL
720631	2002 AZ_{215}	—	September 24, 2017	Haleakala	Pan-STARRS 1	·	810 m	MPC · JPL
720632	2002 AV_{216}	—	July 30, 2014	Haleakala	Pan-STARRS 1	·	750 m	MPC · JPL
720633	2002 BT_{33}	—	January 2, 2013	Mount Lemmon	Mount Lemmon Survey	·	2.2 km	MPC · JPL
720634	2002 BH_{34}	—	January 30, 2009	Mount Lemmon	Mount Lemmon Survey	·	600 m	MPC · JPL
720635	2002 CY	—	February 2, 2002	Cima Ekar	ADAS	·	1.8 km	MPC · JPL
720636	2002 CD_{196}	—	February 10, 2002	Socorro	LINEAR	·	1.8 km	MPC · JPL
720637	2002 CN_{199}	—	February 7, 2002	Palomar	NEAT	·	2.8 km	MPC · JPL
720638	2002 CO_{229}	—	February 9, 2002	Kitt Peak	Spacewatch	KON	2.4 km	MPC · JPL
720639	2002 CW_{259}	—	February 7, 2002	Kitt Peak	Spacewatch	·	630 m	MPC · JPL
720640	2002 CE_{264}	—	February 9, 2002	Kitt Peak	Spacewatch	·	2.9 km	MPC · JPL
720641	2002 CA_{266}	—	February 7, 2002	Kitt Peak	Spacewatch	·	1.0 km	MPC · JPL
720642	2002 CY_{270}	—	February 10, 2002	Socorro	LINEAR	·	640 m	MPC · JPL
720643	2002 CQ_{271}	—	February 8, 2002	Kitt Peak	Spacewatch	·	770 m	MPC · JPL
720644	2002 CG_{273}	—	February 8, 2002	Kitt Peak	Spacewatch	·	980 m	MPC · JPL
720645	2002 CE_{294}	—	December 17, 2001	Kitt Peak	Deep Lens Survey	·	2.0 km	MPC · JPL
720646	2002 CV_{311}	—	February 11, 2002	Socorro	LINEAR	·	1 km	MPC · JPL
720647	2002 CH_{316}	—	February 6, 2002	Palomar	NEAT	·	2.2 km	MPC · JPL
720648	2002 CM_{316}	—	January 7, 2006	Kitt Peak	Spacewatch	EUN	1.4 km	MPC · JPL
720649	2002 CU_{316}	—	December 19, 2001	Palomar	NEAT	·	3.0 km	MPC · JPL
720650	2002 CO_{318}	—	January 17, 2009	Kitt Peak	Spacewatch	·	640 m	MPC · JPL
720651	2002 CP_{318}	—	February 12, 2010	WISE	WISE	NYS	1.8 km	MPC · JPL
720652	2002 CL_{319}	—	November 17, 2006	Kitt Peak	Spacewatch	·	2.5 km	MPC · JPL
720653	2002 CG_{320}	—	January 17, 2013	Haleakala	Pan-STARRS 1	·	1.9 km	MPC · JPL
720654	2002 CH_{321}	—	October 21, 2011	Kitt Peak	Spacewatch	·	2.5 km	MPC · JPL
720655	2002 CU_{323}	—	March 28, 2010	WISE	WISE	KON	2.0 km	MPC · JPL
720656	2002 CP_{326}	—	March 22, 2015	Haleakala	Pan-STARRS 1	·	900 m	MPC · JPL
720657	2002 CZ_{326}	—	April 30, 2009	Mount Lemmon	Mount Lemmon Survey	·	2.6 km	MPC · JPL
720658	2002 CG_{328}	—	January 10, 2013	Haleakala	Pan-STARRS 1	L4	6.7 km	MPC · JPL
720659	2002 CM_{328}	—	February 14, 2002	Kitt Peak	Spacewatch	·	1.3 km	MPC · JPL
720660	2002 DS_{4}	—	February 17, 2002	Cerro Tololo	Deep Lens Survey	·	570 m	MPC · JPL
720661	2002 DA_{7}	—	February 20, 2002	Kitt Peak	Spacewatch	·	2.9 km	MPC · JPL
720662	2002 DS_{11}	—	February 17, 2002	Palomar	NEAT	PHO	1.6 km	MPC · JPL
720663	2002 DX_{20}	—	February 9, 2002	Palomar	NEAT	PHO	2.5 km	MPC · JPL
720664	2002 DC_{21}	—	February 21, 2002	Kitt Peak	Spacewatch	·	2.1 km	MPC · JPL
720665	2002 DD_{21}	—	March 11, 2002	Palomar	NEAT	·	1.8 km	MPC · JPL
720666	2002 DM_{21}	—	November 28, 2005	Kitt Peak	Spacewatch	·	1.5 km	MPC · JPL
720667	2002 DX_{21}	—	February 26, 2008	Kitt Peak	Spacewatch	ULA	4.8 km	MPC · JPL
720668	2002 DZ_{21}	—	February 14, 2012	Haleakala	Pan-STARRS 1	·	520 m	MPC · JPL
720669	2002 EY_{22}	—	March 11, 2002	Palomar	NEAT	·	1.8 km	MPC · JPL
720670	2002 EO_{34}	—	March 11, 2002	Palomar	NEAT	HNS	1.3 km	MPC · JPL
720671	2002 EP_{38}	—	March 12, 2002	Kitt Peak	Spacewatch	·	1.2 km	MPC · JPL
720672	2002 EB_{58}	—	February 10, 2002	Socorro	LINEAR	·	1.9 km	MPC · JPL
720673	2002 EN_{127}	—	March 12, 2002	Palomar	NEAT	·	2.5 km	MPC · JPL
720674	2002 EN_{140}	—	March 12, 2002	Palomar	NEAT	·	690 m	MPC · JPL
720675	2002 EV_{145}	—	March 13, 2002	Palomar	NEAT	BRA	1.3 km	MPC · JPL
720676	2002 ET_{153}	—	March 20, 2002	Kitt Peak	Spacewatch	·	2.2 km	MPC · JPL
720677	2002 EG_{158}	—	March 20, 2002	Kitt Peak	Spacewatch	T_{j} (2.99) · EUP	2.2 km	MPC · JPL
720678	2002 EV_{163}	—	March 4, 2010	WISE	WISE	ADE	1.8 km	MPC · JPL
720679	2002 EM_{164}	—	March 5, 2002	Kitt Peak	Spacewatch	·	1.7 km	MPC · JPL
720680	2002 EQ_{164}	—	August 14, 2012	Siding Spring	SSS	·	1.2 km	MPC · JPL
720681	2002 EV_{164}	—	April 19, 2010	WISE	WISE	·	1.6 km	MPC · JPL
720682	2002 ED_{165}	—	February 1, 2012	Mount Lemmon	Mount Lemmon Survey	·	660 m	MPC · JPL
720683	2002 EE_{165}	—	May 4, 2010	WISE	WISE	·	1.3 km	MPC · JPL
720684	2002 EG_{165}	—	February 23, 2012	Mount Lemmon	Mount Lemmon Survey	·	650 m	MPC · JPL
720685	2002 EL_{165}	—	February 14, 2013	Haleakala	Pan-STARRS 1	·	2.3 km	MPC · JPL
720686	2002 EP_{165}	—	September 14, 2005	Catalina	CSS	·	4.1 km	MPC · JPL
720687	2002 EY_{165}	—	June 9, 2010	WISE	WISE	·	2.9 km	MPC · JPL
720688	2002 EP_{166}	—	February 14, 2013	Mount Lemmon	Mount Lemmon Survey	·	2.2 km	MPC · JPL
720689	2002 ES_{166}	—	January 19, 2012	Haleakala	Pan-STARRS 1	·	590 m	MPC · JPL
720690	2002 EU_{166}	—	March 28, 2008	Kitt Peak	Spacewatch	EOS	1.6 km	MPC · JPL
720691	2002 EF_{167}	—	October 29, 2010	Mount Lemmon	Mount Lemmon Survey	·	1.5 km	MPC · JPL
720692	2002 EH_{167}	—	July 7, 2016	Haleakala	Pan-STARRS 1	(194)	1.2 km	MPC · JPL
720693	2002 EJ_{167}	—	September 22, 2008	Kitt Peak	Spacewatch	MAR	770 m	MPC · JPL
720694	2002 EP_{167}	—	March 4, 2002	Cima Ekar	ADAS	·	510 m	MPC · JPL
720695	2002 ER_{169}	—	October 9, 2005	Kitt Peak	Spacewatch	3:2 · SHU	5.4 km	MPC · JPL
720696	2002 EH_{170}	—	March 4, 2012	Mount Lemmon	Mount Lemmon Survey	·	550 m	MPC · JPL
720697	2002 EW_{170}	—	September 19, 2008	Kitt Peak	Spacewatch	·	1.3 km	MPC · JPL
720698	2002 ET_{171}	—	September 24, 2009	Mount Lemmon	Mount Lemmon Survey	EOS	1.5 km	MPC · JPL
720699	2002 EU_{171}	—	January 25, 2009	Kitt Peak	Spacewatch	V	550 m	MPC · JPL
720700	2002 EA_{172}	—	October 2, 2005	Mount Lemmon	Mount Lemmon Survey	·	2.3 km	MPC · JPL

== 720701–720800 ==
back to top

Designation			Discovery			Properties		Ref
Permanent	Provisional	Named after	Date	Site	Discoverer(s)	Category	Diam.	Ref
720701	2002 EX_{172}	—	March 5, 2002	Apache Point	SDSS Collaboration	·	2.6 km	MPC · JPL
720702	2002 FF_{15}	—	March 16, 2002	Haleakala	NEAT	·	1.0 km	MPC · JPL
720703	2002 FK_{18}	—	March 18, 2002	Kitt Peak	Deep Ecliptic Survey	·	490 m	MPC · JPL
720704	2002 FO_{43}	—	August 20, 2004	Kitt Peak	Spacewatch	3:2	4.4 km	MPC · JPL
720705	2002 GZ	—	April 3, 2002	Palomar	NEAT	·	2.9 km	MPC · JPL
720706	2002 GA_{30}	—	April 7, 2002	Cerro Tololo	Deep Ecliptic Survey	·	960 m	MPC · JPL
720707	2002 GA_{63}	—	April 8, 2002	Palomar	NEAT	·	2.3 km	MPC · JPL
720708	2002 GR_{120}	—	March 13, 2002	Kitt Peak	Spacewatch	·	1.9 km	MPC · JPL
720709	2002 GX_{132}	—	April 12, 2002	Socorro	LINEAR	·	1.7 km	MPC · JPL
720710	2002 GK_{135}	—	April 12, 2002	Socorro	LINEAR	·	970 m	MPC · JPL
720711	2002 GV_{180}	—	April 12, 2002	Palomar	NEAT	·	1.2 km	MPC · JPL
720712	2002 GE_{181}	—	April 10, 2002	Palomar	NEAT	EUN	1.1 km	MPC · JPL
720713	2002 GX_{189}	—	August 18, 2006	Kitt Peak	Spacewatch	·	570 m	MPC · JPL
720714	2002 GL_{191}	—	July 11, 2003	Haleakala	NEAT	·	3.9 km	MPC · JPL
720715	2002 GM_{191}	—	March 25, 2006	Catalina	CSS	·	2.8 km	MPC · JPL
720716	2002 GU_{191}	—	November 3, 2005	Mount Lemmon	Mount Lemmon Survey	·	5.2 km	MPC · JPL
720717	2002 GV_{191}	—	October 27, 2008	Kitt Peak	Spacewatch	·	2.8 km	MPC · JPL
720718	2002 GQ_{192}	—	August 31, 2005	Kitt Peak	Spacewatch	·	3.9 km	MPC · JPL
720719	2002 GP_{194}	—	August 9, 2015	Haleakala	Pan-STARRS 2	·	1.2 km	MPC · JPL
720720	2002 GY_{195}	—	June 1, 2010	WISE	WISE	·	1.1 km	MPC · JPL
720721	2002 GD_{196}	—	May 14, 2015	Haleakala	Pan-STARRS 1	·	920 m	MPC · JPL
720722	2002 GE_{196}	—	March 20, 2007	Mount Lemmon	Mount Lemmon Survey	·	1.7 km	MPC · JPL
720723	2002 GW_{196}	—	February 24, 2006	Mount Lemmon	Mount Lemmon Survey	·	1.4 km	MPC · JPL
720724	2002 GW_{197}	—	April 8, 2002	Palomar	NEAT	·	1.5 km	MPC · JPL
720725	2002 HD_{8}	—	April 19, 2002	Kitt Peak	Spacewatch	·	860 m	MPC · JPL
720726	2002 HT_{14}	—	April 17, 2002	Socorro	LINEAR	·	2.2 km	MPC · JPL
720727	2002 HQ_{16}	—	April 4, 2002	Palomar	NEAT	·	2.1 km	MPC · JPL
720728	2002 HE_{19}	—	May 11, 2015	Mount Lemmon	Mount Lemmon Survey	·	840 m	MPC · JPL
720729	2002 HG_{19}	—	June 3, 2010	WISE	WISE	·	1.4 km	MPC · JPL
720730	2002 JE_{14}	—	May 7, 2002	Palomar	NEAT	T_{j} (2.99)	3.5 km	MPC · JPL
720731	2002 JG_{90}	—	May 11, 2002	Socorro	LINEAR	·	1.6 km	MPC · JPL
720732	2002 JL_{120}	—	April 11, 2002	Palomar	NEAT	JUN	1.2 km	MPC · JPL
720733	2002 JO_{141}	—	May 10, 2002	Kitt Peak	Spacewatch	·	750 m	MPC · JPL
720734	2002 JL_{148}	—	May 15, 2002	Palomar	NEAT	·	3.7 km	MPC · JPL
720735	2002 JX_{149}	—	April 11, 2002	Palomar	NEAT	TIR	3.4 km	MPC · JPL
720736	2002 JQ_{151}	—	August 14, 2007	Siding Spring	SSS	·	2.1 km	MPC · JPL
720737	2002 JX_{151}	—	May 6, 2002	Socorro	LINEAR	·	4.0 km	MPC · JPL
720738	2002 JJ_{153}	—	September 24, 2008	Mount Lemmon	Mount Lemmon Survey	·	1.1 km	MPC · JPL
720739	2002 KO_{17}	—	May 31, 2010	WISE	WISE	·	1.5 km	MPC · JPL
720740	2002 KT_{17}	—	January 31, 2010	WISE	WISE	·	2.3 km	MPC · JPL
720741	2002 LA_{65}	—	June 4, 2006	Mount Lemmon	Mount Lemmon Survey	PHO	1.1 km	MPC · JPL
720742	2002 LQ_{65}	—	April 20, 2009	Mount Lemmon	Mount Lemmon Survey	·	830 m	MPC · JPL
720743	2002 LV_{65}	—	January 19, 2017	Mount Lemmon	Mount Lemmon Survey	·	2.6 km	MPC · JPL
720744	2002 MN_{6}	—	June 16, 2002	Palomar	NEAT	GEF	1.4 km	MPC · JPL
720745	2002 NE_{56}	—	July 14, 2002	Palomar	NEAT	·	3.0 km	MPC · JPL
720746	2002 NJ_{60}	—	September 25, 1998	Anderson Mesa	LONEOS	·	1.2 km	MPC · JPL
720747	2002 NT_{60}	—	August 13, 2002	Socorro	LINEAR	(5)	1.5 km	MPC · JPL
720748	2002 NE_{64}	—	July 8, 2002	Palomar	NEAT	·	1.4 km	MPC · JPL
720749	2002 NG_{65}	—	July 5, 2002	Palomar	NEAT	·	2.1 km	MPC · JPL
720750	2002 NZ_{66}	—	July 8, 2002	Palomar	NEAT	·	1.2 km	MPC · JPL
720751	2002 NA_{72}	—	July 9, 2002	Palomar	NEAT	·	1.2 km	MPC · JPL
720752	2002 NB_{76}	—	September 7, 2008	Mount Lemmon	Mount Lemmon Survey	EOS	1.8 km	MPC · JPL
720753	2002 NQ_{78}	—	February 9, 2010	WISE	WISE	·	3.3 km	MPC · JPL
720754	2002 NR_{78}	—	October 14, 2007	Mount Lemmon	Mount Lemmon Survey	·	1.2 km	MPC · JPL
720755	2002 NE_{79}	—	September 4, 2011	Haleakala	Pan-STARRS 1	·	1.4 km	MPC · JPL
720756	2002 NG_{79}	—	August 10, 2002	Cerro Tololo	Deep Ecliptic Survey	·	1.4 km	MPC · JPL
720757	2002 NO_{79}	—	May 9, 2010	Catalina	CSS	·	3.2 km	MPC · JPL
720758	2002 NJ_{80}	—	March 13, 2010	WISE	WISE	·	3.0 km	MPC · JPL
720759	2002 NM_{81}	—	March 1, 2010	WISE	WISE	·	3.6 km	MPC · JPL
720760	2002 NS_{83}	—	July 7, 2002	Kitt Peak	Spacewatch	·	2.1 km	MPC · JPL
720761	2002 NT_{83}	—	December 20, 2004	Mount Lemmon	Mount Lemmon Survey	·	2.8 km	MPC · JPL
720762	2002 NW_{83}	—	December 1, 2006	Kitt Peak	Spacewatch	·	620 m	MPC · JPL
720763	2002 OZ_{8}	—	July 12, 2002	Palomar	NEAT	·	580 m	MPC · JPL
720764	2002 OE_{19}	—	July 20, 2002	Palomar	NEAT	T_{j} (2.98)	3.1 km	MPC · JPL
720765	2002 OF_{23}	—	July 2, 2002	Palomar	NEAT	(194)	1.7 km	MPC · JPL
720766	2002 OK_{28}	—	August 6, 2002	Palomar	NEAT	BRA	1.6 km	MPC · JPL
720767	2002 OJ_{29}	—	May 1, 2006	Kitt Peak	Spacewatch	·	2.8 km	MPC · JPL
720768	2002 OL_{29}	—	July 11, 2002	Campo Imperatore	CINEOS	·	880 m	MPC · JPL
720769	2002 OK_{38}	—	February 4, 2016	Haleakala	Pan-STARRS 1	TEL	1.3 km	MPC · JPL
720770	2002 OR_{38}	—	September 25, 2011	Haleakala	Pan-STARRS 1	·	1.5 km	MPC · JPL
720771	2002 PD_{1}	—	August 3, 2002	Palomar	NEAT	·	550 m	MPC · JPL
720772	2002 PW_{6}	—	August 5, 2002	Palomar	NEAT	·	2.4 km	MPC · JPL
720773	2002 PH_{11}	—	July 22, 2002	Palomar	NEAT	·	640 m	MPC · JPL
720774	2002 PV_{17}	—	August 6, 2002	Palomar	NEAT	DOR	2.6 km	MPC · JPL
720775	2002 PD_{20}	—	July 21, 2002	Palomar	NEAT	·	1.6 km	MPC · JPL
720776	2002 PH_{21}	—	August 6, 2002	Palomar	NEAT	·	670 m	MPC · JPL
720777	2002 PT_{36}	—	July 29, 2002	Palomar	NEAT	DOR	2.5 km	MPC · JPL
720778	2002 PZ_{36}	—	August 1, 2002	Socorro	LINEAR	·	1.6 km	MPC · JPL
720779	2002 PM_{51}	—	July 14, 2002	Palomar	NEAT	·	3.4 km	MPC · JPL
720780	2002 PP_{52}	—	August 8, 2002	Palomar	NEAT	TIR	3.0 km	MPC · JPL
720781	2002 PS_{64}	—	August 3, 2002	Palomar	NEAT	·	1.4 km	MPC · JPL
720782	2002 PQ_{75}	—	August 8, 2002	Palomar	NEAT	·	2.5 km	MPC · JPL
720783	2002 PE_{78}	—	August 11, 2002	Palomar	NEAT	·	1.3 km	MPC · JPL
720784	2002 PG_{95}	—	August 13, 2002	Palomar	NEAT	TIR	3.2 km	MPC · JPL
720785	2002 PT_{98}	—	August 8, 2002	Palomar	NEAT	·	3.2 km	MPC · JPL
720786	2002 PW_{100}	—	July 29, 2002	Palomar	NEAT	·	990 m	MPC · JPL
720787	2002 PW_{106}	—	August 4, 2002	Palomar	NEAT	KON	2.3 km	MPC · JPL
720788	2002 PZ_{149}	—	August 11, 2002	Cerro Tololo	Deep Ecliptic Survey	MAS	690 m	MPC · JPL
720789	2002 PH_{150}	—	July 22, 2002	Palomar	NEAT	V	620 m	MPC · JPL
720790	2002 PB_{151}	—	August 6, 2002	Palomar	NEAT	·	1.0 km	MPC · JPL
720791	2002 PH_{154}	—	August 9, 2002	Cerro Tololo	Deep Ecliptic Survey	·	550 m	MPC · JPL
720792	2002 PY_{155}	—	July 7, 2002	Kitt Peak	Spacewatch	·	840 m	MPC · JPL
720793	2002 PG_{161}	—	July 29, 2002	Palomar	NEAT	·	3.0 km	MPC · JPL
720794	2002 PV_{161}	—	August 8, 2002	Palomar	NEAT	EUN	1.5 km	MPC · JPL
720795	2002 PC_{162}	—	August 18, 2002	Palomar	NEAT	·	1.1 km	MPC · JPL
720796	2002 PV_{175}	—	August 7, 2002	Palomar	NEAT	PHO	990 m	MPC · JPL
720797	2002 PN_{176}	—	August 11, 2002	Palomar	NEAT	EOS	1.6 km	MPC · JPL
720798	2002 PP_{176}	—	August 7, 2002	Palomar	NEAT	·	1.7 km	MPC · JPL
720799	2002 PB_{177}	—	August 15, 2002	Palomar	NEAT	MAR	1.2 km	MPC · JPL
720800	2002 PW_{178}	—	August 15, 2002	Palomar	NEAT	·	1.9 km	MPC · JPL

== 720801–720900 ==
back to top

Designation			Discovery			Properties		Ref
Permanent	Provisional	Named after	Date	Site	Discoverer(s)	Category	Diam.	Ref
720801	2002 PF_{182}	—	August 15, 2002	Palomar	NEAT	·	480 m	MPC · JPL
720802	2002 PV_{182}	—	August 8, 2002	Palomar	NEAT	·	2.5 km	MPC · JPL
720803	2002 PY_{183}	—	August 6, 2002	Palomar	NEAT	·	910 m	MPC · JPL
720804	2002 PM_{184}	—	August 7, 2002	Campo Imperatore	CINEOS	·	1.2 km	MPC · JPL
720805	2002 PX_{185}	—	July 7, 2002	Kitt Peak	Spacewatch	·	2.4 km	MPC · JPL
720806	2002 PW_{190}	—	August 15, 2002	Palomar	NEAT	·	1.3 km	MPC · JPL
720807	2002 PE_{192}	—	August 7, 2002	Palomar	NEAT	·	2.0 km	MPC · JPL
720808	2002 PM_{192}	—	August 8, 2002	Palomar	NEAT	·	1.2 km	MPC · JPL
720809	2002 PD_{193}	—	October 5, 2002	Apache Point	SDSS Collaboration	EUN	1.3 km	MPC · JPL
720810	2002 PO_{194}	—	May 24, 2010	WISE	WISE	·	2.1 km	MPC · JPL
720811	2002 PQ_{194}	—	February 1, 2005	Kitt Peak	Spacewatch	·	2.0 km	MPC · JPL
720812	2002 PW_{194}	—	January 8, 2005	Campo Imperatore	CINEOS	·	3.0 km	MPC · JPL
720813	2002 PT_{196}	—	November 30, 2003	Kitt Peak	Spacewatch	·	3.6 km	MPC · JPL
720814	2002 PW_{196}	—	September 15, 2007	Pic du Midi	Pic du Midi	·	1.9 km	MPC · JPL
720815	2002 PA_{197}	—	August 15, 2002	Palomar	NEAT	·	2.7 km	MPC · JPL
720816	2002 PC_{198}	—	August 25, 2002	Palomar Mountain	NEAT	EUN	1.0 km	MPC · JPL
720817	2002 PM_{202}	—	September 3, 2002	Campo Imperatore	CINEOS	·	1.0 km	MPC · JPL
720818	2002 PV_{202}	—	September 1, 2002	Palomar	NEAT	T_{j} (2.93)	4.9 km	MPC · JPL
720819	2002 PO_{204}	—	March 7, 2010	WISE	WISE	·	2.8 km	MPC · JPL
720820	2002 PB_{205}	—	March 2, 2010	WISE	WISE	·	3.8 km	MPC · JPL
720821	2002 PM_{205}	—	October 7, 2008	Mount Lemmon	Mount Lemmon Survey	·	1.5 km	MPC · JPL
720822	2002 PN_{205}	—	July 9, 2010	WISE	WISE	·	2.0 km	MPC · JPL
720823	2002 PP_{205}	—	October 10, 2008	Mount Lemmon	Mount Lemmon Survey	LIX	2.9 km	MPC · JPL
720824	2002 PY_{205}	—	April 21, 2010	WISE	WISE	·	1.7 km	MPC · JPL
720825	2002 QO_{15}	—	August 28, 2002	Palomar	NEAT	TIR	2.8 km	MPC · JPL
720826	2002 QQ_{15}	—	September 5, 2002	Socorro	LINEAR	PHO	930 m	MPC · JPL
720827	2002 QO_{21}	—	August 26, 2002	Palomar	NEAT	·	880 m	MPC · JPL
720828	2002 QK_{29}	—	August 17, 2002	Palomar	NEAT	·	2.1 km	MPC · JPL
720829	2002 QQ_{33}	—	August 19, 2002	Palomar	NEAT	·	1.1 km	MPC · JPL
720830	2002 QQ_{35}	—	August 20, 2002	Palomar	NEAT	NYS	1.0 km	MPC · JPL
720831	2002 QU_{39}	—	August 16, 2002	Palomar	NEAT	·	1.4 km	MPC · JPL
720832	2002 QG_{52}	—	September 6, 2002	Socorro	LINEAR	·	710 m	MPC · JPL
720833	2002 QZ_{55}	—	August 15, 2002	Kitt Peak	Spacewatch	·	600 m	MPC · JPL
720834	2002 QY_{57}	—	September 5, 2002	Socorro	LINEAR	·	1.4 km	MPC · JPL
720835	2002 QG_{58}	—	August 8, 2002	Campo Imperatore	CINEOS	·	900 m	MPC · JPL
720836	2002 QP_{63}	—	August 30, 2002	Palomar	NEAT	·	3.6 km	MPC · JPL
720837	2002 QS_{70}	—	August 28, 2002	Palomar	NEAT	·	1.6 km	MPC · JPL
720838	2002 QQ_{72}	—	August 18, 2002	Palomar	NEAT	·	770 m	MPC · JPL
720839	2002 QU_{72}	—	September 2, 2002	Kitt Peak	Spacewatch	·	1.3 km	MPC · JPL
720840	2002 QU_{73}	—	August 28, 2002	Palomar	NEAT	(5)	960 m	MPC · JPL
720841	2002 QH_{97}	—	August 27, 2002	Palomar Mountain	NEAT	EOS	2.0 km	MPC · JPL
720842	2002 QC_{99}	—	August 16, 2002	Palomar	NEAT	·	1.4 km	MPC · JPL
720843	2002 QJ_{101}	—	August 11, 2002	Palomar	NEAT	·	1.7 km	MPC · JPL
720844	2002 QK_{101}	—	July 23, 2002	Palomar	NEAT	·	3.1 km	MPC · JPL
720845	2002 QQ_{101}	—	April 4, 2005	Mount Lemmon	Mount Lemmon Survey	·	2.6 km	MPC · JPL
720846	2002 QS_{101}	—	September 6, 2002	Socorro	LINEAR	·	3.2 km	MPC · JPL
720847	2002 QD_{102}	—	August 27, 2002	Palomar Mountain	NEAT	·	1.5 km	MPC · JPL
720848	2002 QE_{103}	—	August 30, 2002	Palomar	NEAT	·	2.8 km	MPC · JPL
720849	2002 QK_{104}	—	August 17, 2002	Palomar	NEAT	·	2.4 km	MPC · JPL
720850	2002 QM_{105}	—	August 30, 2002	Kitt Peak	Spacewatch	·	1.5 km	MPC · JPL
720851	2002 QF_{110}	—	August 27, 2002	Palomar	NEAT	(194)	1.6 km	MPC · JPL
720852	2002 QA_{120}	—	August 30, 2002	Palomar	NEAT	·	1.3 km	MPC · JPL
720853	2002 QH_{123}	—	August 29, 2002	Palomar	NEAT	·	770 m	MPC · JPL
720854	2002 QM_{126}	—	August 17, 2002	Palomar	NEAT	·	1.5 km	MPC · JPL
720855	2002 QN_{130}	—	August 30, 2002	Palomar	NEAT	·	960 m	MPC · JPL
720856	2002 QW_{131}	—	August 30, 2002	Palomar	NEAT	·	2.2 km	MPC · JPL
720857	2002 QJ_{136}	—	December 21, 2008	Mount Lemmon	Mount Lemmon Survey	PAD	2.8 km	MPC · JPL
720858	2002 QK_{137}	—	August 17, 2002	Palomar	NEAT	·	1.5 km	MPC · JPL
720859	2002 QO_{137}	—	August 29, 2002	Palomar	NEAT	·	1.3 km	MPC · JPL
720860	2002 QV_{138}	—	August 27, 2002	Palomar	NEAT	·	1.2 km	MPC · JPL
720861	2002 QW_{142}	—	October 22, 2008	Kitt Peak	Spacewatch	·	2.2 km	MPC · JPL
720862	2002 QX_{142}	—	November 8, 2007	Kitt Peak	Spacewatch	·	1.4 km	MPC · JPL
720863	2002 QT_{143}	—	October 24, 2008	Kitt Peak	Spacewatch	·	1.5 km	MPC · JPL
720864	2002 QB_{144}	—	March 4, 2005	Mount Lemmon	Mount Lemmon Survey	·	2.5 km	MPC · JPL
720865	2002 QP_{144}	—	August 29, 2002	Palomar	NEAT	THM	1.7 km	MPC · JPL
720866	2002 QR_{145}	—	March 21, 2010	Mount Lemmon	Mount Lemmon Survey	·	2.5 km	MPC · JPL
720867	2002 QE_{146}	—	October 10, 2002	Kitt Peak	Spacewatch	·	1.2 km	MPC · JPL
720868	2002 QO_{146}	—	August 19, 2002	Palomar	NEAT	·	750 m	MPC · JPL
720869	2002 QR_{146}	—	August 27, 2009	Catalina	CSS	·	680 m	MPC · JPL
720870	2002 QW_{146}	—	August 29, 2002	Palomar	NEAT	·	2.0 km	MPC · JPL
720871	2002 QX_{146}	—	August 29, 2002	Palomar	NEAT	MAR	1.0 km	MPC · JPL
720872	2002 QD_{151}	—	February 22, 2007	Rehoboth	L. A. Molnar	3:2	5.5 km	MPC · JPL
720873	2002 QG_{151}	—	August 30, 2011	Haleakala	Pan-STARRS 1	·	1.6 km	MPC · JPL
720874	2002 QK_{151}	—	October 2, 2009	Mount Lemmon	Mount Lemmon Survey	·	4.1 km	MPC · JPL
720875	2002 QO_{151}	—	June 23, 2010	Mount Lemmon	Mount Lemmon Survey	·	2.7 km	MPC · JPL
720876	2002 QS_{151}	—	March 11, 2005	Mount Lemmon	Mount Lemmon Survey	NYS	890 m	MPC · JPL
720877	2002 QR_{152}	—	August 30, 2002	Palomar	NEAT	NYS	1.1 km	MPC · JPL
720878	2002 QO_{156}	—	August 24, 2002	Palomar	NEAT	·	2.3 km	MPC · JPL
720879	2002 QT_{157}	—	March 5, 2011	Mount Lemmon	Mount Lemmon Survey	·	960 m	MPC · JPL
720880	2002 QC_{158}	—	December 14, 1995	Kitt Peak	Spacewatch	3:2 · SHU	5.3 km	MPC · JPL
720881	2002 QE_{158}	—	August 27, 2002	Palomar	NEAT	·	2.4 km	MPC · JPL
720882	2002 QK_{158}	—	August 28, 2002	Palomar	NEAT	·	3.2 km	MPC · JPL
720883	2002 QN_{159}	—	December 18, 2007	Mount Lemmon	Mount Lemmon Survey	BRG	1.1 km	MPC · JPL
720884	2002 RE_{7}	—	August 16, 2002	Haleakala	NEAT	H	490 m	MPC · JPL
720885	2002 RG_{23}	—	August 28, 2002	Palomar	NEAT	·	1.2 km	MPC · JPL
720886	2002 RN_{26}	—	August 22, 2002	Palomar	NEAT	·	3.7 km	MPC · JPL
720887	2002 RU_{27}	—	August 20, 2002	Palomar	NEAT	·	3.1 km	MPC · JPL
720888	2002 RJ_{36}	—	August 28, 2002	Palomar	NEAT	·	1.1 km	MPC · JPL
720889	2002 RH_{53}	—	August 20, 2002	Palomar	NEAT	BRG	1.5 km	MPC · JPL
720890	2002 RZ_{65}	—	August 28, 2002	Palomar	NEAT	EMA	3.2 km	MPC · JPL
720891	2002 RJ_{66}	—	August 28, 2002	Palomar	NEAT	H	650 m	MPC · JPL
720892	2002 RR_{124}	—	August 20, 2002	Palomar	NEAT	EUN	1.5 km	MPC · JPL
720893	2002 RJ_{128}	—	August 15, 2002	Socorro	LINEAR	·	1.5 km	MPC · JPL
720894	2002 RY_{128}	—	September 10, 2002	Palomar	NEAT	·	1.5 km	MPC · JPL
720895	2002 RE_{130}	—	September 11, 2002	Palomar	NEAT	·	2.2 km	MPC · JPL
720896	2002 RC_{138}	—	August 16, 2002	Haleakala	NEAT	·	1.6 km	MPC · JPL
720897	2002 RO_{143}	—	September 11, 2002	Palomar	NEAT	·	2.5 km	MPC · JPL
720898	2002 RM_{164}	—	August 29, 2002	Kitt Peak	Spacewatch	·	3.3 km	MPC · JPL
720899	2002 RL_{165}	—	September 13, 2002	Palomar	NEAT	·	1.3 km	MPC · JPL
720900	2002 RD_{172}	—	August 30, 2002	Palomar	NEAT	LEO	1.5 km	MPC · JPL

== 720901–721000 ==
back to top

Designation			Discovery			Properties		Ref
Permanent	Provisional	Named after	Date	Site	Discoverer(s)	Category	Diam.	Ref
720901	2002 RG_{177}	—	September 13, 2002	Palomar	NEAT	·	1.8 km	MPC · JPL
720902	2002 RC_{181}	—	September 4, 2002	Anderson Mesa	LONEOS	BRU	3.2 km	MPC · JPL
720903	2002 RB_{184}	—	September 12, 2002	Palomar	NEAT	EUN	1.5 km	MPC · JPL
720904	2002 RC_{194}	—	September 12, 2002	Palomar	NEAT	NYS	750 m	MPC · JPL
720905	2002 RM_{201}	—	August 29, 2002	Palomar	NEAT	·	820 m	MPC · JPL
720906	2002 RD_{206}	—	September 14, 2002	Palomar	NEAT	·	2.7 km	MPC · JPL
720907	2002 RY_{206}	—	September 14, 2002	Palomar	NEAT	EOS	1.7 km	MPC · JPL
720908	2002 RQ_{207}	—	September 14, 2002	Palomar	NEAT	·	1.5 km	MPC · JPL
720909	2002 RB_{208}	—	September 12, 2002	Palomar	NEAT	·	2.2 km	MPC · JPL
720910	2002 RH_{209}	—	September 14, 2002	Palomar	NEAT	·	1.6 km	MPC · JPL
720911	2002 RR_{209}	—	September 15, 2002	Kitt Peak	Spacewatch	·	3.3 km	MPC · JPL
720912	2002 RX_{213}	—	August 12, 2002	Socorro	LINEAR	·	1.6 km	MPC · JPL
720913	2002 RR_{225}	—	September 6, 2002	Socorro	LINEAR	·	740 m	MPC · JPL
720914	2002 RJ_{227}	—	August 16, 2002	Kitt Peak	Spacewatch	·	820 m	MPC · JPL
720915	2002 RP_{238}	—	September 12, 2002	Palomar	NEAT	·	3.7 km	MPC · JPL
720916	2002 RB_{245}	—	August 13, 2002	Kitt Peak	Spacewatch	NYS	770 m	MPC · JPL
720917	2002 RV_{245}	—	September 4, 2002	Palomar	NEAT	·	1.2 km	MPC · JPL
720918	2002 RL_{248}	—	August 29, 2002	Kitt Peak	Spacewatch	·	1.3 km	MPC · JPL
720919	2002 RN_{248}	—	September 8, 2002	Haleakala	NEAT	·	2.9 km	MPC · JPL
720920	2002 RM_{250}	—	September 1, 2002	Palomar	NEAT	·	3.1 km	MPC · JPL
720921	2002 RC_{253}	—	September 14, 2002	Palomar	NEAT	·	2.7 km	MPC · JPL
720922	2002 RT_{254}	—	September 14, 2002	Palomar	NEAT	·	2.4 km	MPC · JPL
720923	2002 RQ_{256}	—	September 13, 2002	Palomar	NEAT	·	540 m	MPC · JPL
720924	2002 RW_{256}	—	October 9, 2002	Kitt Peak	Spacewatch	·	1.0 km	MPC · JPL
720925	2002 RB_{264}	—	September 11, 2002	Palomar	NEAT	·	1.4 km	MPC · JPL
720926	2002 RK_{269}	—	September 10, 2002	Palomar	NEAT	·	3.8 km	MPC · JPL
720927	2002 RA_{270}	—	September 4, 2002	Palomar	NEAT	·	1.3 km	MPC · JPL
720928	2002 RR_{272}	—	August 16, 2002	Kitt Peak	Spacewatch	·	920 m	MPC · JPL
720929	2002 RE_{273}	—	September 14, 2002	Palomar	NEAT	·	3.4 km	MPC · JPL
720930	2002 RT_{274}	—	August 8, 2002	Campo Imperatore	CINEOS	(2076)	600 m	MPC · JPL
720931	2002 RY_{274}	—	September 4, 2002	Palomar	NEAT	THM	2.1 km	MPC · JPL
720932	2002 RM_{280}	—	October 16, 1998	Kitt Peak	Spacewatch	KON	2.4 km	MPC · JPL
720933	2002 RE_{287}	—	September 11, 2002	Palomar	NEAT	·	1.9 km	MPC · JPL
720934	2002 RH_{288}	—	September 17, 1995	Kitt Peak	Spacewatch	·	590 m	MPC · JPL
720935	2002 RU_{288}	—	February 25, 2006	Kitt Peak	Spacewatch	·	4.1 km	MPC · JPL
720936	2002 RV_{289}	—	September 14, 2002	Palomar	NEAT	THM	1.8 km	MPC · JPL
720937	2002 RJ_{292}	—	December 22, 2008	Kitt Peak	Spacewatch	HOF	2.6 km	MPC · JPL
720938	2002 RN_{292}	—	September 3, 2002	Palomar	NEAT	GEF	880 m	MPC · JPL
720939	2002 RR_{293}	—	April 29, 2010	WISE	WISE	MAR	1.2 km	MPC · JPL
720940	2002 RC_{294}	—	October 31, 2008	Mount Lemmon	Mount Lemmon Survey	·	3.5 km	MPC · JPL
720941	2002 RV_{294}	—	May 27, 2014	Haleakala	Pan-STARRS 1	·	1.1 km	MPC · JPL
720942	2002 RA_{295}	—	July 21, 2010	Siding Spring	SSS	·	1.3 km	MPC · JPL
720943	2002 RE_{295}	—	April 11, 2010	WISE	WISE	·	1.7 km	MPC · JPL
720944	2002 RH_{295}	—	December 3, 2004	Kitt Peak	Spacewatch	LUT	5.8 km	MPC · JPL
720945	2002 RD_{296}	—	May 4, 2005	Mount Lemmon	Mount Lemmon Survey	EUN	3.1 km	MPC · JPL
720946	2002 RE_{296}	—	May 6, 2006	Mount Lemmon	Mount Lemmon Survey	·	3.5 km	MPC · JPL
720947	2002 RH_{296}	—	August 27, 2009	La Sagra	OAM	·	900 m	MPC · JPL
720948	2002 RO_{296}	—	September 30, 2006	Mount Lemmon	Mount Lemmon Survey	·	1.0 km	MPC · JPL
720949	2002 RZ_{296}	—	September 29, 2008	Catalina	CSS	·	3.4 km	MPC · JPL
720950	2002 RB_{297}	—	July 5, 2010	WISE	WISE	T_{j} (2.98) · 3:2	5.0 km	MPC · JPL
720951	2002 RQ_{297}	—	August 13, 2012	Haleakala	Pan-STARRS 1	·	620 m	MPC · JPL
720952	2002 RW_{297}	—	September 23, 2008	Catalina	CSS	·	3.9 km	MPC · JPL
720953	2002 RC_{298}	—	October 23, 2006	Kitt Peak	Spacewatch	·	970 m	MPC · JPL
720954	2002 RF_{298}	—	October 7, 2016	Mount Lemmon	Mount Lemmon Survey	·	1.7 km	MPC · JPL
720955	2002 RH_{299}	—	April 10, 2010	Mount Lemmon	Mount Lemmon Survey	·	1.3 km	MPC · JPL
720956	2002 RK_{299}	—	January 16, 2005	Kitt Peak	Spacewatch	CLO	1.9 km	MPC · JPL
720957	2002 RV_{299}	—	January 4, 2016	Haleakala	Pan-STARRS 1	·	3.0 km	MPC · JPL
720958	2002 RK_{300}	—	April 13, 2010	Mount Lemmon	Mount Lemmon Survey	·	1.5 km	MPC · JPL
720959	2002 RV_{300}	—	November 7, 2002	Kitt Peak	Deep Ecliptic Survey	·	2.5 km	MPC · JPL
720960	2002 RW_{300}	—	September 6, 2013	Mount Lemmon	Mount Lemmon Survey	·	2.2 km	MPC · JPL
720961	2002 RB_{301}	—	March 14, 2016	Mount Lemmon	Mount Lemmon Survey	·	2.5 km	MPC · JPL
720962	2002 SQ_{8}	—	September 27, 2002	Palomar	NEAT	·	1.1 km	MPC · JPL
720963	2002 SE_{16}	—	September 3, 2002	Palomar	NEAT	·	2.8 km	MPC · JPL
720964	2002 SK_{22}	—	September 16, 2002	Palomar	NEAT	·	820 m	MPC · JPL
720965	2002 SC_{23}	—	September 10, 2002	Haleakala	NEAT	TIR	2.9 km	MPC · JPL
720966	2002 SH_{34}	—	September 16, 2002	Palomar	NEAT	·	1.1 km	MPC · JPL
720967	2002 SS_{35}	—	September 29, 2002	Haleakala	NEAT	·	1.6 km	MPC · JPL
720968	2002 SU_{47}	—	September 17, 2002	Haleakala	NEAT	·	1.9 km	MPC · JPL
720969	2002 SX_{66}	—	October 1, 2002	Kleť	M. Tichý, M. Kočer	HNS	1.1 km	MPC · JPL
720970	2002 SN_{67}	—	September 3, 2002	Campo Imperatore	CINEOS	·	1.3 km	MPC · JPL
720971	2002 SA_{73}	—	September 16, 2002	Palomar	NEAT	·	890 m	MPC · JPL
720972	2002 SP_{74}	—	October 19, 1995	Kitt Peak	Spacewatch	·	910 m	MPC · JPL
720973	2002 SP_{75}	—	December 23, 2003	Socorro	LINEAR	·	3.7 km	MPC · JPL
720974	2002 TB_{82}	—	October 1, 2002	Haleakala	NEAT	·	4.2 km	MPC · JPL
720975	2002 TM_{92}	—	October 3, 2002	Socorro	LINEAR	·	4.6 km	MPC · JPL
720976	2002 TT_{112}	—	October 3, 2002	Socorro	LINEAR	·	2.6 km	MPC · JPL
720977	2002 TO_{114}	—	October 3, 2002	Palomar	NEAT	·	3.0 km	MPC · JPL
720978	2002 TL_{123}	—	September 3, 2002	Palomar	NEAT	·	1.8 km	MPC · JPL
720979	2002 TY_{135}	—	September 21, 2002	Palomar	NEAT	·	2.3 km	MPC · JPL
720980	2002 TJ_{137}	—	September 21, 2002	Palomar	NEAT	TIR	3.6 km	MPC · JPL
720981	2002 TD_{141}	—	October 5, 2002	Kitt Peak	Spacewatch	·	1.4 km	MPC · JPL
720982	2002 TP_{147}	—	October 4, 2002	Kitt Peak	Spacewatch	·	970 m	MPC · JPL
720983	2002 TN_{154}	—	September 4, 2002	Palomar	NEAT	·	1.3 km	MPC · JPL
720984	2002 TG_{156}	—	August 28, 2002	Palomar	NEAT	EUN	1.1 km	MPC · JPL
720985	2002 TY_{158}	—	October 5, 2002	Palomar	NEAT	·	3.4 km	MPC · JPL
720986	2002 TN_{166}	—	October 3, 2002	Palomar	NEAT	THB	2.8 km	MPC · JPL
720987	2002 TU_{167}	—	September 11, 2002	Palomar	NEAT	·	3.0 km	MPC · JPL
720988	2002 TX_{169}	—	September 3, 2002	Palomar	NEAT	·	2.3 km	MPC · JPL
720989	2002 TA_{182}	—	October 3, 2002	Palomar	NEAT	·	3.5 km	MPC · JPL
720990	2002 TD_{187}	—	September 14, 2002	Haleakala	NEAT	JUN	910 m	MPC · JPL
720991	2002 TC_{213}	—	October 8, 2002	Palomar	NEAT	(22805)	4.0 km	MPC · JPL
720992	2002 TF_{244}	—	October 10, 2002	Palomar	NEAT	·	620 m	MPC · JPL
720993	2002 TG_{246}	—	October 9, 2002	Anderson Mesa	LONEOS	·	3.5 km	MPC · JPL
720994	2002 TH_{249}	—	June 17, 2010	WISE	WISE	·	2.9 km	MPC · JPL
720995	2002 TS_{252}	—	October 3, 2002	Socorro	LINEAR	·	4.0 km	MPC · JPL
720996	2002 TA_{300}	—	October 7, 2002	Palomar	NEAT	(5)	1.1 km	MPC · JPL
720997	2002 TR_{302}	—	April 10, 2005	Mount Lemmon	Mount Lemmon Survey	HOF	3.2 km	MPC · JPL
720998	2002 TB_{305}	—	October 4, 2002	Apache Point	SDSS Collaboration	·	1.9 km	MPC · JPL
720999	2002 TF_{308}	—	September 29, 2002	Haleakala	NEAT	·	620 m	MPC · JPL
721000	2002 TG_{308}	—	October 15, 2002	Palomar	NEAT	·	3.0 km	MPC · JPL

== Meaning of names ==
As minor planet discoveries are confirmed, they are given a permanent number by the IAU's Minor Planet Center (MPC), and the discoverers can then submit names for them, following the IAU's naming conventions. The list below concerns those minor planets in the specified number-range that have received names, and explains the meanings of those names.

Official naming citations of newly named small Solar System bodies are approved and published in a bulletin by IAU's Working Group for Small Bodies Nomenclature (WGSBN). Before May 2021, citations were published in MPC's Minor Planet Circulars for many decades. Recent citations can also be found on the JPL Small-Body Database (SBDB). Until his death in 2016, German astronomer Lutz D. Schmadel compiled these citations into the Dictionary of Minor Planet Names (DMP) and regularly updated the collection.

Based on Paul Herget's The Names of the Minor Planets, Schmadel also researched the unclear origin of numerous asteroids, most of which had been named prior to World War II. This article incorporates text from this source, which is in the public domain: SBDB New namings may only be added to this list below after official publication as the preannouncement of names is condemned. The WGSBN publishes a comprehensive guideline for the naming rules of non-cometary small Solar System bodies.

Named minor planet	Provisional	This minor planet was named for...	Ref · Catalog
720549 Cırık	2001 US_{224}	Önder Cırık, Turkish intellectual, ecologist, and nature documentarian who conducted research on the natural history of Anatolia.	IAU · 720549
