= 34351 Decatur =

Main-belt asteroid

Discovery
- Discovered by: L. Ball
- Discovery site: Emerald Lane Obs.
- Discovery date: 3 September 2000

Designations
- Named after: Decatur (U.S. city)
- Alternative designations: 2000 RZ_{8} · 1996 YW_{3} 1998 HF_{58}
- Minor planet category: main-belt · (outer); Koronis

Orbital characteristics
- Epoch 23 March 2018 (JD 2458200.5)
- Uncertainty parameter 0
- Observation arc: 26.31 yr (9,609 d)
- Aphelion: 3.1502 AU
- Perihelion: 2.7415 AU
- Semi-major axis: 2.9458 AU
- Eccentricity: 0.0694
- Orbital period (sidereal): 5.06 yr (1,847 d)
- Mean anomaly: 108.47°
- Mean motion: 0° 11^{m} 41.64^{s} / day
- Inclination: 1.2964°
- Longitude of ascending node: 343.30°
- Argument of perihelion: 85.412°

Physical characteristics
- Mean diameter: 3.54±0.27 km
- Geometric albedo: 0.224±0.043
- Spectral type: Q (SDSS-MOC)
- Absolute magnitude (H): 14.7

34351 Decatur (provisional designation 2000 RZ_{8}) is a Koronis asteroid from the outer region of the asteroid belt, approximately 3.5 kilometers (2.2 miles) in diameter. It was discovered on 3 September 2000, by American amateur astronomer Loren Ball at his Emerald Lane Observatory in Alabama, United States. The Q-type asteroid was named after the city of Decatur, location of the discovering observatory.

== Orbit and classification ==
Decatur is a member of the Koronis family (605), a very large outer asteroid family with nearly co-planar ecliptical orbits. It orbits the Sun in the outer main-belt at a distance of 2.7–3.2 AU once every 5 years and 1 month (1,847 days; semi-major axis of 2.95 AU). Its orbit has an eccentricity of 0.07 and an inclination of 1° with respect to the ecliptic. The asteroid's observation arc begins 8 years prior to its official discovery observation, with a precovery taken by the Steward Observatory's Spacewatch survey at Kitt Peak in January 1992.

== Naming ==
This minor planet was named after the city of Decatur in the U.S. state of Alabama, location of the discovering observatory and home of the discoverer. Decatur is located near NASA's Marshall Space Flight Center. The official naming citation was published by the Minor Planet Center on 27 April 2002 (M.P.C. 45345).

== Physical characteristics ==
In the SDSS-based taxonomy, Decatur is a Q-type asteroid, while members of the Koronis family are typically S-type asteroid. According to the survey carried out by the NEOWISE mission of NASA's Wide-field Infrared Survey Explorer, Decatur measures 3.54 kilometers in diameter and its surface has an albedo of 0.224.

=== Rotation period ===
As of 2018, no rotational lightcurve of Decatur has been obtained from photometric observations. The body's rotation period, pole and shape remain unknown.
