= Decatur High School =

Decatur High School could refer to:

- Decatur High School (Alabama) — Decatur, Alabama
- Decatur High School (Arkansas) — Decatur, Arkansas
- Decatur High School (Georgia) — Decatur, Georgia
- Stephen Decatur High School (Decatur, Illinois), (1911–2000)
- Decatur High School (Michigan) — Decatur, Michigan
- Decatur High School (Texas) — Decatur, Texas
- Decatur High School (Federal Way, Washington) — Federal Way, Washington
- Decatur Central High School — Indianapolis, Indiana
- Stephen Decatur High School (Maryland) — Berlin, Maryland
