= Doug Decatur =

Doug Decatur is a baseball writer and one of the pioneers of the modern age of baseball analysis.

== Career ==
Beginning in 1984, he worked as a statistical consultant to five major league baseball teams, the Cincinnati Reds, Milwaukee Brewers, Chicago Cubs, Houston Astros and Atlanta Braves.

Decatur is the author of Behind-the-Scenes-Baseball and Traded, both published by ACTA Sports, Chicago Illinois. Traded was ranked by the author Ron Kaplan as the 157th must read baseball book of all time in his book, 501 Baseball Books Fans Must Read Before They Die.

The book Moneyball: The Art of Winning an Unfair Game and the movie Moneyball were vindication for all early statistical pioneers in major league baseball.

Decatur is also an accomplished playwright, having staged both 10-minute and full-length plays for Cincinnati Playwrights Initiative and The Village Players in Fort Thomas, Kentucky. He has completed a fictional novel, Black Acre with his wife, the actor, playwright and publicist, Susan Medure Decatur.
