= Decatur Township =

Decatur Township may refer to the following places in the United States:

- Decatur Township, Macon County, Illinois
- Decatur Township, Marion County, Indiana
- Decatur Township, Michigan
- Decatur Township, Burt County, Nebraska
- Decatur Township, Lawrence County, Ohio
- Decatur Township, Washington County, Ohio
- Decatur Township, Clearfield County, Pennsylvania
- Decatur Township, Mifflin County, Pennsylvania
