= Decatur, Missouri =

Extinct hamlet in Missouri, U.S.

Coordinates: 38.4525304°N 92.4199077°W

Decatur is an extinct town in Cole County, in the U.S. state of Missouri. The GNIS classifies it as a populated place.

A post office called Decatur was established in 1875, and remained in operation until 1906. The community has the name of Stephen Decatur, a United States Navy officer.
