= Decatur County =

Decatur County is the name of various past and present counties in the United States, all named for Stephen Decatur:

- Decatur County, Georgia
- Decatur County, Indiana
- Decatur County, Iowa
- Decatur County, Kansas
- Decatur County, Tennessee
- Decatur County, Alabama, a former county
- Decatur County, Missouri, a previous name for Ozark County, Missouri
