= Meanings of minor-planet names: 92001–93000 =

As minor planet discoveries are confirmed, they are given a permanent number by the IAU's Minor Planet Center (MPC), and the discoverers can then submit names for them, following the IAU's naming conventions. The list below concerns those minor planets in the specified number-range that have received names, and explains the meanings of those names.

Official naming citations of newly named small Solar System bodies are approved and published in a bulletin by IAU's Working Group for Small Bodies Nomenclature (WGSBN). Before May 2021, citations were published in MPC's Minor Planet Circulars for many decades. Recent citations can also be found on the JPL Small-Body Database (SBDB). Until his death in 2016, German astronomer Lutz D. Schmadel compiled these citations into the Dictionary of Minor Planet Names (DMP) and regularly updated the collection.

Based on Paul Herget's The Names of the Minor Planets, Schmadel also researched the unclear origin of numerous asteroids, most of which had been named prior to World War II. This article incorporates text from this source, which is in the public domain: SBDB New namings may only be added to this list below after official publication as the preannouncement of names is condemned. The WGSBN publishes a comprehensive guideline for the naming rules of non-cometary small Solar System bodies.

== 92001–92100 ==
Named minor planet	Provisional	This minor planet was named for...	Ref · Catalog
92097 Aidai	1999 XX_{37}	Ehime University, whose nickname is Aidai, is one of the 87 national universities in Japan. It was established in 1949 with the consolidation of four schools. Since the foundation of the Research Center for Space and Cosmic Evolution in 2007, Aidai has promoted the study of astronomy and cosmology.	JPL · 92097

== 92101–92200 ==
back to top

Named minor planet	Provisional	This minor planet was named for...	Ref · Catalog
There are no named minor planets in this number range

== 92201–92300 ==
back to top

Named minor planet	Provisional	This minor planet was named for...	Ref · Catalog
92209 Pingtang	1999 YS_{17}	Pingtang County, situated in southwestern China in Qiannan Buyi and Miao autonomous prefecture, Guizhou province, has rich tourism resources, especially the world's best-preserved karst landform, providing a unique site for constructing FAST (the Five-hundred-meter Aperture Spherical radio Telescope)	JPL · 92209
92213 Kalina	2000 AQ_{6}	Antonín Kalina (1902–1990) was a Czech citizen who was imprisoned in Buchenwald concentration camp from 1939 to 1945. As a member of the Communist Underground he saved some 900 children and youths from dangers of daily life in the camp. In 2012 he was recognized as Righteous Among the Nations.	JPL · 92213
92251 Kuconis	2000 AF_{187}	As the Executive Officer of MIT Lincoln Laboratory, John E. Kuconis (born 1951) provided outstanding leadership for Director's Office initiatives. He was responsible for community outreach, including outreach for the LINEAR program.	IAU · 92251
92279 Bindiluca	2000 DG	Luca Bindi (born 1971) holds the Chair of Mineralogy and Crystallography at the University of Florence, Italy. He has received many national and international scientific awards, including the President of the Republic Prize 2015 of the Lincei Academy. He is renowned for the discovery of quasicrystals in nature.	JPL · 92279
92297 Monrad	2000 EL_{156}	Ingrid "Twink" Monrad (born 1945) is a meteorite hunter in Tucson, Arizona. With Jim Kriegh and John Blennert, she is one of the co-discoverers of the Gold Basin Meteorite Strewn Field	JPL · 92297
92300 Hagelin	2000 ET_{198}	Jerry Hagelin (born 1938) is well known throughout the state of Arizona for his selfless work with children as the state director of Child Evangelism Fellowship and as pastor of Desert Gardens Cumberland Presbyterian Church.	JPL · 92300

== 92301–92400 ==
back to top

Named minor planet	Provisional	This minor planet was named for...	Ref · Catalog
92389 Gretskij	2000 JZ_{3}	Andrej M. Gretskij (born 1945) is an associate professor at Kharkiv Karazin National University. He has been a pioneer in the study of the brightness-phase curve of Saturn's rings and is author of many astronomical textbooks. His lectures have had a big impact among students of astronomy in Ukraine	JPL · 92389

== 92401–92500 ==
back to top

Named minor planet	Provisional	This minor planet was named for...	Ref · Catalog
There are no named minor planets in this number range

== 92501–92600 ==
back to top

Named minor planet	Provisional	This minor planet was named for...	Ref · Catalog
92525 Delucchi	2000 OV_{2}	Fausto Delucchi (born 1947) is a Swiss amateur astronomer in Vico Morcote. He shares his astronomical passion by showing the beauty of celestial objects to visitors at the public Calina Observatory in Carona.	JPL · 92525
92578 Benecchi	2000 OC_{62}	Robert J. Benecchi (born 1966), husband of American discoverer Susan D. Kern, is a hardware design engineer who has contributed to the development of numerous wireless communication and medical device technologies.	JPL · 92578
92579 Dwight	2000 OK_{69}	Edward (Ed) Joseph Dwight Jr. (born 1933) was the first African American astronaut candidate. He served in the US Air Force, working as test pilot before serving in the Aerospace Research Pilot School. After leaving the Air Force he went onto be an influential sculptor and author.	JPL · 92579
92585 Fumagalli	2000 PP_{8}	Francesco Fumagalli (born 1958) is an Italian telescope maker and amateur astronomer who observes variable stars. He lives in Bregazzana di Varese.	JPL · 92585
92586 Jaxonpowell	2000 PS_{8}	Jaxon Powell (born 2018) is the nephew of American amateur astronomer Loren C. Ball, who discovered this minor planet.	JPL · 92586

== 92601–92700 ==
back to top

Named minor planet	Provisional	This minor planet was named for...	Ref · Catalog
92614 Kazutami	2000 QY	Kazutami Namikoshi (born 1938), who lives in Tokyo, Japan, with his wife Kyoko, is a friend of the discoverer Stefano Sposetti.	JPL · 92614
92685 Cordellorenz	2000 QD_{71}	Francis Merritt Cordell and Philip Jack Lorenz, American astronomers after whom the Cordell–Lorenz Observatory at The University of the South in Sewanee, Tennessee, is named. Francis restored the 1897 Alvan Clark refractor and guided the renovation of the observatory's dome. Philip reintroduced the astronomy classes at the university and established the public observing program at the observatory.	JPL · 92685

== 92701–92800 ==
back to top

Named minor planet	Provisional	This minor planet was named for...	Ref · Catalog
There are no named minor planets in this number range

== 92801–92900 ==
back to top

Named minor planet	Provisional	This minor planet was named for...	Ref · Catalog
92891 Bless	2000 QK_{236}	Robert Bless (1927–2015), was an American astronomer who served on the astronomy faculty at the University of Wisconsin in Madison from 1958 until 1995. An expert in stellar energy distributions, he taught and encouraged many astronomy graduate students, including the discoverer (Robert L. Millis), whose Ph.D. thesis research he advised (Src).	JPL · 92891
92892 Robertlawrence	2000 QO_{244}	Robert H. Lawrence Jr. (1935–1967) was selected for the Manned Orbiting Laboratory (MOL) program. He was the first African American to be selected as an astronaut and was the only MOL astronaut with a doctorate. He perished in a plane crash before he had the opportunity to go to space.	JPL · 92892
92893 Michaelperson	2000 QE_{247}	Michael J. Person (born 1970), a planetary scientist at the Massachusetts Institute of Technology. He specializes in occultation studies of small bodies in the outer solar system, especially Neptune's moon Triton, Pluto and Charon.	JPL · 92893
92894 Bluford	2000 QA_{248}	Guion Steward Bluford Jr. (born 1942) was the first African American astronaut in space. He was a part of four missions between 1983 and 1992, which included deploying satellites, testing robotic arms, and conducting research. Bluford logged a total of 688 hours in space.	JPL · 92894

== 92901–93000 ==
back to top

Named minor planet	Provisional	This minor planet was named for...	Ref · Catalog
There are no named minor planets in this number range

back to top

Preceded by 91,001–92,000	Meanings of minor-planet names List of minor planets: 92,001–93,000	Succeeded by 93,001–94,000
