= List of minor planets: 92001–93000 =

The following is a partial list of minor planets, running from minor-planet number 92001 through 93000, inclusive. The primary data for this and other partial lists is based on JPL's "Small-Body Orbital Elements" and data available from the Minor Planet Center. Critical list information is also provided by the MPC, unless otherwise specified from Lowell Observatory. A detailed description of the table's columns and additional sources are given on the main page including a complete list of every page in this series, and a statistical break-up on the dynamical classification of minor planets.

Also see the summary list of all named bodies in numerical and alphabetical order, and the corresponding naming citations for the number range of this particular list. New namings may only be added to this list after official publication, as the preannouncement of names is condemned by the Working Group for Small Bodies Nomenclature of the International Astronomical Union.

Near-Earth obj.	MBA (inner)	MBA (outer)	Centaur
Mars-crosser	MBA (middle)	Jupiter trojan	Trans-Neptunian obj.
Unclassified

== 92001–92100 ==
Designation			Discovery			Properties		Ref
Permanent	Provisional	Named after	Date	Site	Discoverer(s)	Category	Diam.	Ref
92001	1999 VA_{145}	—	November 13, 1999	Catalina	CSS	·	5.3 km	MPC · JPL
92002	1999 VX_{147}	—	November 14, 1999	Socorro	LINEAR	·	4.2 km	MPC · JPL
92003	1999 VG_{149}	—	November 14, 1999	Socorro	LINEAR	·	6.1 km	MPC · JPL
92004	1999 VG_{151}	—	November 14, 1999	Socorro	LINEAR	·	5.5 km	MPC · JPL
92005	1999 VH_{155}	—	November 14, 1999	Kitt Peak	Spacewatch	·	7.8 km	MPC · JPL
92006	1999 VR_{155}	—	November 9, 1999	Socorro	LINEAR	·	5.5 km	MPC · JPL
92007	1999 VS_{155}	—	November 9, 1999	Socorro	LINEAR	·	4.6 km	MPC · JPL
92008	1999 VP_{156}	—	November 12, 1999	Socorro	LINEAR	·	4.1 km	MPC · JPL
92009	1999 VM_{157}	—	November 14, 1999	Socorro	LINEAR	·	2.8 km	MPC · JPL
92010	1999 VB_{159}	—	November 14, 1999	Socorro	LINEAR	NAE	6.4 km	MPC · JPL
92011	1999 VJ_{159}	—	November 14, 1999	Socorro	LINEAR	·	15 km	MPC · JPL
92012	1999 VT_{159}	—	November 14, 1999	Socorro	LINEAR	·	6.9 km	MPC · JPL
92013	1999 VV_{159}	—	November 14, 1999	Socorro	LINEAR	·	6.4 km	MPC · JPL
92014	1999 VZ_{159}	—	November 14, 1999	Socorro	LINEAR	·	4.2 km	MPC · JPL
92015	1999 VK_{160}	—	November 14, 1999	Socorro	LINEAR	·	5.5 km	MPC · JPL
92016	1999 VR_{160}	—	November 14, 1999	Socorro	LINEAR	·	5.2 km	MPC · JPL
92017	1999 VV_{160}	—	November 14, 1999	Socorro	LINEAR	(1298)	5.4 km	MPC · JPL
92018	1999 VW_{162}	—	November 14, 1999	Socorro	LINEAR	·	7.6 km	MPC · JPL
92019	1999 VH_{163}	—	November 14, 1999	Socorro	LINEAR	KOR	3.5 km	MPC · JPL
92020	1999 VE_{164}	—	November 14, 1999	Socorro	LINEAR	·	5.5 km	MPC · JPL
92021	1999 VJ_{164}	—	November 14, 1999	Socorro	LINEAR	·	4.1 km	MPC · JPL
92022	1999 VU_{165}	—	November 14, 1999	Socorro	LINEAR	EOS	3.3 km	MPC · JPL
92023	1999 VM_{167}	—	November 14, 1999	Socorro	LINEAR	·	5.3 km	MPC · JPL
92024	1999 VK_{169}	—	November 14, 1999	Socorro	LINEAR	HYG	5.7 km	MPC · JPL
92025	1999 VY_{171}	—	November 14, 1999	Socorro	LINEAR	·	9.6 km	MPC · JPL
92026	1999 VW_{176}	—	November 5, 1999	Socorro	LINEAR	URS	9.0 km	MPC · JPL
92027	1999 VH_{177}	—	November 5, 1999	Socorro	LINEAR	·	6.9 km	MPC · JPL
92028	1999 VM_{177}	—	November 5, 1999	Socorro	LINEAR	·	6.2 km	MPC · JPL
92029	1999 VV_{177}	—	November 6, 1999	Socorro	LINEAR	HYG	7.6 km	MPC · JPL
92030	1999 VX_{177}	—	November 6, 1999	Socorro	LINEAR	·	4.3 km	MPC · JPL
92031	1999 VB_{178}	—	November 6, 1999	Socorro	LINEAR	·	4.6 km	MPC · JPL
92032	1999 VE_{178}	—	November 6, 1999	Socorro	LINEAR	·	6.4 km	MPC · JPL
92033	1999 VG_{179}	—	November 6, 1999	Socorro	LINEAR	·	5.7 km	MPC · JPL
92034	1999 VP_{179}	—	November 6, 1999	Socorro	LINEAR	URS	3.5 km	MPC · JPL
92035	1999 VD_{180}	—	November 5, 1999	Socorro	LINEAR	·	2.1 km	MPC · JPL
92036	1999 VZ_{180}	—	November 7, 1999	Socorro	LINEAR	H	1.2 km	MPC · JPL
92037	1999 VV_{185}	—	November 15, 1999	Socorro	LINEAR	THM	4.1 km	MPC · JPL
92038	1999 VK_{186}	—	November 15, 1999	Socorro	LINEAR	·	5.7 km	MPC · JPL
92039	1999 VJ_{187}	—	November 15, 1999	Socorro	LINEAR	·	6.3 km	MPC · JPL
92040	1999 VQ_{192}	—	November 1, 1999	Anderson Mesa	LONEOS	·	7.9 km	MPC · JPL
92041	1999 VV_{194}	—	November 2, 1999	Catalina	CSS	KOR	3.6 km	MPC · JPL
92042	1999 VB_{195}	—	November 3, 1999	Catalina	CSS	EOS	4.2 km	MPC · JPL
92043	1999 VJ_{196}	—	November 1, 1999	Catalina	CSS	·	7.7 km	MPC · JPL
92044	1999 VL_{196}	—	November 1, 1999	Catalina	CSS	KOR	2.9 km	MPC · JPL
92045	1999 VO_{199}	—	November 2, 1999	Catalina	CSS	·	6.2 km	MPC · JPL
92046	1999 VG_{200}	—	November 5, 1999	Catalina	CSS	TIR	4.4 km	MPC · JPL
92047	1999 VR_{200}	—	November 3, 1999	Socorro	LINEAR	·	5.0 km	MPC · JPL
92048	1999 VW_{202}	—	November 6, 1999	Catalina	CSS	·	4.0 km	MPC · JPL
92049	1999 VN_{203}	—	November 8, 1999	Anderson Mesa	LONEOS	·	8.1 km	MPC · JPL
92050	1999 VQ_{205}	—	November 11, 1999	Catalina	CSS	EOS	4.3 km	MPC · JPL
92051	1999 VM_{206}	—	November 9, 1999	Catalina	CSS	·	6.1 km	MPC · JPL
92052	1999 VU_{206}	—	November 10, 1999	Socorro	LINEAR	GEF	3.4 km	MPC · JPL
92053	1999 VJ_{210}	—	November 12, 1999	Anderson Mesa	LONEOS	·	4.9 km	MPC · JPL
92054	1999 VL_{210}	—	November 12, 1999	Anderson Mesa	LONEOS	·	6.1 km	MPC · JPL
92055	1999 VJ_{213}	—	November 12, 1999	Anderson Mesa	LONEOS	·	6.8 km	MPC · JPL
92056	1999 VM_{213}	—	November 13, 1999	Anderson Mesa	LONEOS	·	13 km	MPC · JPL
92057	1999 VS_{215}	—	November 3, 1999	Socorro	LINEAR	·	5.4 km	MPC · JPL
92058	1999 VW_{216}	—	November 3, 1999	Catalina	CSS	·	4.6 km	MPC · JPL
92059	1999 VW_{223}	—	November 5, 1999	Socorro	LINEAR	·	3.9 km	MPC · JPL
92060	1999 WY_{6}	—	November 28, 1999	Višnjan Observatory	K. Korlević	·	10 km	MPC · JPL
92061	1999 WA_{8}	—	November 29, 1999	Olathe	Robinson, L.	·	4.7 km	MPC · JPL
92062	1999 WJ_{10}	—	November 28, 1999	Kitt Peak	Spacewatch	EOS	3.2 km	MPC · JPL
92063	1999 WY_{10}	—	November 29, 1999	Kitt Peak	Spacewatch	·	10 km	MPC · JPL
92064	1999 WA_{13}	—	November 26, 1999	Ondřejov	L. Kotková	·	4.1 km	MPC · JPL
92065	1999 WC_{13}	—	November 28, 1999	Kitt Peak	Spacewatch	·	7.2 km	MPC · JPL
92066	1999 WA_{14}	—	November 28, 1999	Kitt Peak	Spacewatch	EOS	6.2 km	MPC · JPL
92067	1999 WP_{14}	—	November 28, 1999	Kitt Peak	Spacewatch	·	5.8 km	MPC · JPL
92068	1999 WT_{14}	—	November 28, 1999	Kitt Peak	Spacewatch	·	6.6 km	MPC · JPL
92069	1999 WV_{15}	—	November 29, 1999	Kitt Peak	Spacewatch	THM	5.0 km	MPC · JPL
92070	1999 WC_{18}	—	November 30, 1999	Kitt Peak	Spacewatch	fast	6.2 km	MPC · JPL
92071	1999 WJ_{18}	—	November 29, 1999	Višnjan Observatory	K. Korlević	·	6.8 km	MPC · JPL
92072	1999 WO_{20}	—	November 16, 1999	Modra	L. Kornoš, J. Tóth	·	8.2 km	MPC · JPL
92073	1999 XA_{3}	—	December 4, 1999	Catalina	CSS	·	3.8 km	MPC · JPL
92074	1999 XR_{3}	—	December 4, 1999	Catalina	CSS	EOS	5.8 km	MPC · JPL
92075	1999 XS_{4}	—	December 4, 1999	Catalina	CSS	fast	5.7 km	MPC · JPL
92076	1999 XZ_{6}	—	December 4, 1999	Catalina	CSS	·	4.4 km	MPC · JPL
92077	1999 XB_{7}	—	December 4, 1999	Catalina	CSS	·	5.8 km	MPC · JPL
92078	1999 XF_{10}	—	December 5, 1999	Catalina	CSS	EOS	4.4 km	MPC · JPL
92079	1999 XN_{10}	—	December 5, 1999	Catalina	CSS	VER	8.0 km	MPC · JPL
92080	1999 XX_{13}	—	December 5, 1999	Socorro	LINEAR	·	6.9 km	MPC · JPL
92081	1999 XV_{17}	—	December 3, 1999	Socorro	LINEAR	BRA	5.9 km	MPC · JPL
92082	1999 XE_{18}	—	December 3, 1999	Socorro	LINEAR	EOS	6.9 km	MPC · JPL
92083	1999 XD_{20}	—	December 5, 1999	Socorro	LINEAR	·	6.0 km	MPC · JPL
92084	1999 XD_{21}	—	December 5, 1999	Socorro	LINEAR	·	6.5 km	MPC · JPL
92085	1999 XH_{21}	—	December 5, 1999	Socorro	LINEAR	·	5.1 km	MPC · JPL
92086	1999 XG_{23}	—	December 6, 1999	Socorro	LINEAR	GEF	3.7 km	MPC · JPL
92087	1999 XL_{23}	—	December 6, 1999	Socorro	LINEAR	EOS	4.1 km	MPC · JPL
92088	1999 XW_{23}	—	December 6, 1999	Socorro	LINEAR	EOS	6.3 km	MPC · JPL
92089	1999 XJ_{24}	—	December 6, 1999	Socorro	LINEAR	·	8.8 km	MPC · JPL
92090	1999 XZ_{26}	—	December 6, 1999	Socorro	LINEAR	THM	6.9 km	MPC · JPL
92091	1999 XL_{28}	—	December 6, 1999	Socorro	LINEAR	EOS	5.3 km	MPC · JPL
92092	1999 XM_{28}	—	December 6, 1999	Socorro	LINEAR	·	5.7 km	MPC · JPL
92093	1999 XD_{29}	—	December 6, 1999	Socorro	LINEAR	EOS	7.5 km	MPC · JPL
92094	1999 XN_{29}	—	December 6, 1999	Socorro	LINEAR	·	12 km	MPC · JPL
92095	1999 XP_{30}	—	December 6, 1999	Socorro	LINEAR	·	6.7 km	MPC · JPL
92096	1999 XJ_{33}	—	December 6, 1999	Socorro	LINEAR	·	4.3 km	MPC · JPL
92097 Aidai	1999 XX_{37}	Aidai	December 3, 1999	Kuma Kogen	A. Nakamura	THM	7.6 km	MPC · JPL
92098	1999 XS_{40}	—	December 7, 1999	Socorro	LINEAR	·	4.5 km	MPC · JPL
92099	1999 XJ_{41}	—	December 7, 1999	Socorro	LINEAR	EOS	4.7 km	MPC · JPL
92100	1999 XR_{43}	—	December 7, 1999	Socorro	LINEAR	·	5.0 km	MPC · JPL

== 92101–92200 ==
back to top

Designation			Discovery			Properties		Ref
Permanent	Provisional	Named after	Date	Site	Discoverer(s)	Category	Diam.	Ref
92101	1999 XY_{46}	—	December 7, 1999	Socorro	LINEAR	·	6.8 km	MPC · JPL
92102	1999 XO_{47}	—	December 7, 1999	Socorro	LINEAR	·	7.2 km	MPC · JPL
92103	1999 XX_{49}	—	December 7, 1999	Socorro	LINEAR	·	5.9 km	MPC · JPL
92104	1999 XA_{53}	—	December 7, 1999	Socorro	LINEAR	THM	4.3 km	MPC · JPL
92105	1999 XB_{54}	—	December 7, 1999	Socorro	LINEAR	THM	5.5 km	MPC · JPL
92106	1999 XH_{55}	—	December 7, 1999	Socorro	LINEAR	·	9.4 km	MPC · JPL
92107	1999 XH_{56}	—	December 7, 1999	Socorro	LINEAR	·	5.8 km	MPC · JPL
92108	1999 XO_{56}	—	December 7, 1999	Socorro	LINEAR	·	9.1 km	MPC · JPL
92109	1999 XV_{57}	—	December 7, 1999	Socorro	LINEAR	·	5.9 km	MPC · JPL
92110	1999 XM_{62}	—	December 7, 1999	Socorro	LINEAR	·	5.2 km	MPC · JPL
92111	1999 XU_{64}	—	December 7, 1999	Socorro	LINEAR	·	6.1 km	MPC · JPL
92112	1999 XY_{69}	—	December 7, 1999	Socorro	LINEAR	THM	7.2 km	MPC · JPL
92113	1999 XE_{73}	—	December 7, 1999	Socorro	LINEAR	·	6.1 km	MPC · JPL
92114	1999 XP_{73}	—	December 7, 1999	Socorro	LINEAR	THM	6.2 km	MPC · JPL
92115	1999 XD_{74}	—	December 7, 1999	Socorro	LINEAR	THM	5.9 km	MPC · JPL
92116	1999 XU_{75}	—	December 7, 1999	Socorro	LINEAR	LIX	10 km	MPC · JPL
92117	1999 XD_{78}	—	December 7, 1999	Socorro	LINEAR	THM	7.6 km	MPC · JPL
92118	1999 XK_{81}	—	December 7, 1999	Socorro	LINEAR	CYB	7.8 km	MPC · JPL
92119	1999 XW_{81}	—	December 7, 1999	Socorro	LINEAR	(1298)	8.2 km	MPC · JPL
92120	1999 XV_{84}	—	December 7, 1999	Socorro	LINEAR	·	6.5 km	MPC · JPL
92121	1999 XN_{87}	—	December 7, 1999	Socorro	LINEAR	AEG	9.5 km	MPC · JPL
92122	1999 XT_{96}	—	December 7, 1999	Socorro	LINEAR	·	13 km	MPC · JPL
92123	1999 XR_{97}	—	December 7, 1999	Socorro	LINEAR	THM	8.2 km	MPC · JPL
92124	1999 XE_{104}	—	December 7, 1999	Campo Catino	Catino, Campo	THM	6.5 km	MPC · JPL
92125	1999 XP_{105}	—	December 10, 1999	Oohira	N. Kawasato	·	5.8 km	MPC · JPL
92126	1999 XX_{106}	—	December 4, 1999	Catalina	CSS	·	9.5 km	MPC · JPL
92127	1999 XE_{107}	—	December 4, 1999	Catalina	CSS	·	8.4 km	MPC · JPL
92128	1999 XL_{107}	—	December 4, 1999	Catalina	CSS	·	10 km	MPC · JPL
92129	1999 XP_{107}	—	December 4, 1999	Catalina	CSS	·	7.4 km	MPC · JPL
92130	1999 XQ_{107}	—	December 4, 1999	Catalina	CSS	EOS	6.0 km	MPC · JPL
92131	1999 XT_{107}	—	December 4, 1999	Catalina	CSS	VER	7.8 km	MPC · JPL
92132	1999 XK_{109}	—	December 4, 1999	Catalina	CSS	EOS	5.4 km	MPC · JPL
92133	1999 XL_{109}	—	December 4, 1999	Catalina	CSS	·	7.6 km	MPC · JPL
92134	1999 XX_{111}	—	December 7, 1999	Socorro	LINEAR	TIR	6.3 km	MPC · JPL
92135	1999 XR_{112}	—	December 11, 1999	Socorro	LINEAR	·	7.8 km	MPC · JPL
92136	1999 XT_{112}	—	December 11, 1999	Socorro	LINEAR	·	4.2 km	MPC · JPL
92137	1999 XA_{113}	—	December 11, 1999	Socorro	LINEAR	·	6.7 km	MPC · JPL
92138	1999 XK_{113}	—	December 11, 1999	Socorro	LINEAR	·	4.4 km	MPC · JPL
92139	1999 XF_{114}	—	December 11, 1999	Socorro	LINEAR	·	6.2 km	MPC · JPL
92140	1999 XR_{114}	—	December 11, 1999	Socorro	LINEAR	·	8.3 km	MPC · JPL
92141	1999 XQ_{115}	—	December 5, 1999	Catalina	CSS	EOS	4.1 km	MPC · JPL
92142	1999 XG_{116}	—	December 5, 1999	Catalina	CSS	EOS	4.1 km	MPC · JPL
92143	1999 XN_{116}	—	December 5, 1999	Catalina	CSS	·	6.8 km	MPC · JPL
92144	1999 XS_{117}	—	December 5, 1999	Catalina	CSS	HYG	7.0 km	MPC · JPL
92145	1999 XE_{121}	—	December 5, 1999	Catalina	CSS	·	8.7 km	MPC · JPL
92146	1999 XF_{122}	—	December 7, 1999	Catalina	CSS	·	3.7 km	MPC · JPL
92147	1999 XH_{122}	—	December 7, 1999	Catalina	CSS	·	5.2 km	MPC · JPL
92148	1999 XU_{123}	—	December 7, 1999	Catalina	CSS	·	4.9 km	MPC · JPL
92149	1999 XN_{124}	—	December 7, 1999	Catalina	CSS	·	6.5 km	MPC · JPL
92150	1999 XQ_{124}	—	December 7, 1999	Catalina	CSS	·	4.6 km	MPC · JPL
92151	1999 XF_{130}	—	December 12, 1999	Socorro	LINEAR	EOS	4.6 km	MPC · JPL
92152	1999 XB_{132}	—	December 12, 1999	Socorro	LINEAR	·	7.4 km	MPC · JPL
92153	1999 XM_{133}	—	December 12, 1999	Socorro	LINEAR	·	7.0 km	MPC · JPL
92154	1999 XD_{136}	—	December 13, 1999	Socorro	LINEAR	H	1.0 km	MPC · JPL
92155	1999 XU_{137}	—	December 11, 1999	Uccle	T. Pauwels	(1118)	8.4 km	MPC · JPL
92156	1999 XS_{139}	—	December 2, 1999	Kitt Peak	Spacewatch	THM	3.2 km	MPC · JPL
92157	1999 XC_{141}	—	December 3, 1999	Kitt Peak	Spacewatch	KOR	3.2 km	MPC · JPL
92158	1999 XW_{141}	—	December 10, 1999	Socorro	LINEAR	H	1.8 km	MPC · JPL
92159	1999 XB_{142}	—	December 12, 1999	Socorro	LINEAR	H	1.1 km	MPC · JPL
92160	1999 XO_{144}	—	December 15, 1999	Oohira	T. Urata	·	8.8 km	MPC · JPL
92161	1999 XV_{144}	—	December 6, 1999	Kitt Peak	Spacewatch	VER	8.2 km	MPC · JPL
92162	1999 XG_{151}	—	December 9, 1999	Anderson Mesa	LONEOS	EOS	6.6 km	MPC · JPL
92163	1999 XD_{153}	—	December 7, 1999	Socorro	LINEAR	·	4.4 km	MPC · JPL
92164	1999 XK_{153}	—	December 7, 1999	Socorro	LINEAR	EOS	4.6 km	MPC · JPL
92165	1999 XW_{160}	—	December 8, 1999	Socorro	LINEAR	HYG	6.9 km	MPC · JPL
92166	1999 XK_{162}	—	December 13, 1999	Socorro	LINEAR	H	1.6 km	MPC · JPL
92167	1999 XG_{166}	—	December 10, 1999	Socorro	LINEAR	EOS	5.8 km	MPC · JPL
92168	1999 XV_{168}	—	December 10, 1999	Socorro	LINEAR	·	8.7 km	MPC · JPL
92169	1999 XN_{181}	—	December 12, 1999	Socorro	LINEAR	·	11 km	MPC · JPL
92170	1999 XU_{183}	—	December 12, 1999	Socorro	LINEAR	·	5.4 km	MPC · JPL
92171	1999 XC_{184}	—	December 12, 1999	Socorro	LINEAR	·	4.8 km	MPC · JPL
92172	1999 XJ_{185}	—	December 12, 1999	Socorro	LINEAR	·	7.7 km	MPC · JPL
92173	1999 XM_{185}	—	December 12, 1999	Socorro	LINEAR	·	6.9 km	MPC · JPL
92174	1999 XZ_{189}	—	December 12, 1999	Socorro	LINEAR	·	6.1 km	MPC · JPL
92175	1999 XP_{191}	—	December 12, 1999	Socorro	LINEAR	·	10 km	MPC · JPL
92176	1999 XG_{194}	—	December 12, 1999	Socorro	LINEAR	·	8.1 km	MPC · JPL
92177	1999 XC_{196}	—	December 12, 1999	Socorro	LINEAR	·	5.5 km	MPC · JPL
92178	1999 XQ_{196}	—	December 12, 1999	Socorro	LINEAR	·	5.3 km	MPC · JPL
92179	1999 XC_{200}	—	December 12, 1999	Socorro	LINEAR	·	11 km	MPC · JPL
92180	1999 XO_{200}	—	December 12, 1999	Socorro	LINEAR	EOS	4.7 km	MPC · JPL
92181	1999 XU_{202}	—	December 12, 1999	Socorro	LINEAR	·	7.0 km	MPC · JPL
92182	1999 XG_{203}	—	December 12, 1999	Socorro	LINEAR	·	8.7 km	MPC · JPL
92183	1999 XE_{204}	—	December 12, 1999	Socorro	LINEAR	·	6.3 km	MPC · JPL
92184	1999 XK_{204}	—	December 12, 1999	Socorro	LINEAR	CYB	13 km	MPC · JPL
92185	1999 XM_{204}	—	December 12, 1999	Socorro	LINEAR	LIX	9.4 km	MPC · JPL
92186	1999 XP_{209}	—	December 13, 1999	Socorro	LINEAR	EOS	4.9 km	MPC · JPL
92187	1999 XB_{212}	—	December 13, 1999	Socorro	LINEAR	·	6.6 km	MPC · JPL
92188	1999 XC_{213}	—	December 14, 1999	Socorro	LINEAR	HYG	5.9 km	MPC · JPL
92189	1999 XM_{214}	—	December 14, 1999	Socorro	LINEAR	·	5.0 km	MPC · JPL
92190	1999 XY_{215}	—	December 13, 1999	Kitt Peak	Spacewatch	VER	5.8 km	MPC · JPL
92191	1999 XO_{222}	—	December 15, 1999	Socorro	LINEAR	HYG	6.7 km	MPC · JPL
92192	1999 XY_{227}	—	December 15, 1999	Socorro	LINEAR	·	8.1 km	MPC · JPL
92193	1999 XG_{230}	—	December 7, 1999	Anderson Mesa	LONEOS	EOS	6.1 km	MPC · JPL
92194	1999 XK_{230}	—	December 7, 1999	Anderson Mesa	LONEOS	EOS	8.3 km	MPC · JPL
92195	1999 XP_{230}	—	December 7, 1999	Anderson Mesa	LONEOS	HYG	7.0 km	MPC · JPL
92196	1999 XX_{233}	—	December 4, 1999	Anderson Mesa	LONEOS	·	6.2 km	MPC · JPL
92197	1999 XA_{234}	—	December 4, 1999	Anderson Mesa	LONEOS	·	5.7 km	MPC · JPL
92198	1999 XH_{239}	—	December 7, 1999	Catalina	CSS	·	6.1 km	MPC · JPL
92199	1999 XE_{240}	—	December 7, 1999	Catalina	CSS	EMA	9.4 km	MPC · JPL
92200	1999 XK_{241}	—	December 12, 1999	Catalina	CSS	·	5.9 km	MPC · JPL

== 92201–92300 ==
back to top

Designation			Discovery			Properties		Ref
Permanent	Provisional	Named after	Date	Site	Discoverer(s)	Category	Diam.	Ref
92201	1999 XU_{242}	—	December 13, 1999	Socorro	LINEAR	·	7.6 km	MPC · JPL
92202	1999 XU_{247}	—	December 6, 1999	Socorro	LINEAR	EOS	5.0 km	MPC · JPL
92203	1999 XT_{251}	—	December 9, 1999	Kitt Peak	Spacewatch	·	4.5 km	MPC · JPL
92204	1999 XZ_{251}	—	December 9, 1999	Kitt Peak	Spacewatch	·	3.7 km	MPC · JPL
92205	1999 YP	—	December 16, 1999	Socorro	LINEAR	H	1.3 km	MPC · JPL
92206	1999 YJ_{6}	—	December 30, 1999	Socorro	LINEAR	H	1.2 km	MPC · JPL
92207	1999 YU_{6}	—	December 30, 1999	Socorro	LINEAR	H	1.3 km	MPC · JPL
92208	1999 YO_{17}	—	December 31, 1999	Socorro	LINEAR	HYG	5.6 km	MPC · JPL
92209 Pingtang	1999 YS_{17}	Pingtang	December 26, 1999	Xinglong	SCAP	EOS	8.3 km	MPC · JPL
92210	2000 AH_{2}	—	January 3, 2000	Oizumi	T. Kobayashi	·	10 km	MPC · JPL
92211	2000 AO_{3}	—	January 2, 2000	Socorro	LINEAR	·	11 km	MPC · JPL
92212	2000 AQ_{5}	—	January 2, 2000	Kitt Peak	Spacewatch	·	7.9 km	MPC · JPL
92213 Kalina	2000 AQ_{6}	Kalina	January 5, 2000	Kleť	M. Tichý	HYG	5.7 km	MPC · JPL
92214	2000 AX_{6}	—	January 2, 2000	Socorro	LINEAR	·	7.6 km	MPC · JPL
92215	2000 AM_{10}	—	January 3, 2000	Socorro	LINEAR	TIR	6.8 km	MPC · JPL
92216	2000 AX_{10}	—	January 3, 2000	Socorro	LINEAR	TEL	3.5 km	MPC · JPL
92217	2000 AD_{12}	—	January 3, 2000	Socorro	LINEAR	·	7.1 km	MPC · JPL
92218	2000 AT_{20}	—	January 3, 2000	Socorro	LINEAR	THM	5.8 km	MPC · JPL
92219	2000 AA_{26}	—	January 3, 2000	Socorro	LINEAR	THM	4.7 km	MPC · JPL
92220	2000 AH_{43}	—	January 5, 2000	Socorro	LINEAR	H	1.1 km	MPC · JPL
92221	2000 AJ_{44}	—	January 5, 2000	Kitt Peak	Spacewatch	THM	4.7 km	MPC · JPL
92222	2000 AP_{48}	—	January 3, 2000	Socorro	LINEAR	H	910 m	MPC · JPL
92223	2000 AN_{82}	—	January 5, 2000	Socorro	LINEAR	THM	5.2 km	MPC · JPL
92224	2000 AR_{87}	—	January 5, 2000	Socorro	LINEAR	·	6.6 km	MPC · JPL
92225	2000 AX_{87}	—	January 5, 2000	Socorro	LINEAR	·	7.9 km	MPC · JPL
92226	2000 AZ_{92}	—	January 3, 2000	Socorro	LINEAR	H	1.2 km	MPC · JPL
92227	2000 AU_{95}	—	January 4, 2000	Socorro	LINEAR	H	1.4 km	MPC · JPL
92228	2000 AT_{98}	—	January 5, 2000	Socorro	LINEAR	·	6.0 km	MPC · JPL
92229	2000 AM_{99}	—	January 5, 2000	Socorro	LINEAR	·	4.4 km	MPC · JPL
92230	2000 AD_{100}	—	January 5, 2000	Socorro	LINEAR	·	8.6 km	MPC · JPL
92231	2000 AT_{101}	—	January 5, 2000	Socorro	LINEAR	·	8.3 km	MPC · JPL
92232	2000 AS_{102}	—	January 5, 2000	Socorro	LINEAR	·	5.0 km	MPC · JPL
92233	2000 AU_{102}	—	January 5, 2000	Socorro	LINEAR	·	23 km	MPC · JPL
92234	2000 AV_{103}	—	January 5, 2000	Socorro	LINEAR	·	8.3 km	MPC · JPL
92235	2000 AK_{104}	—	January 5, 2000	Socorro	LINEAR	·	5.8 km	MPC · JPL
92236	2000 AM_{112}	—	January 5, 2000	Socorro	LINEAR	·	6.6 km	MPC · JPL
92237	2000 AO_{120}	—	January 5, 2000	Socorro	LINEAR	HYG	6.6 km	MPC · JPL
92238	2000 AM_{131}	—	January 2, 2000	Socorro	LINEAR	EOS	4.7 km	MPC · JPL
92239	2000 AA_{139}	—	January 5, 2000	Socorro	LINEAR	EOS	6.1 km	MPC · JPL
92240	2000 AM_{146}	—	January 7, 2000	Socorro	LINEAR	H	1.0 km	MPC · JPL
92241	2000 AK_{148}	—	January 6, 2000	Socorro	LINEAR	GEF	3.3 km	MPC · JPL
92242	2000 AO_{148}	—	January 7, 2000	Socorro	LINEAR	BRA	6.0 km	MPC · JPL
92243	2000 AP_{148}	—	January 7, 2000	Socorro	LINEAR	·	10 km	MPC · JPL
92244	2000 AR_{148}	—	January 7, 2000	Socorro	LINEAR	·	8.6 km	MPC · JPL
92245	2000 AY_{149}	—	January 7, 2000	Socorro	LINEAR	·	7.0 km	MPC · JPL
92246	2000 AQ_{153}	—	January 2, 2000	Socorro	LINEAR	·	8.5 km	MPC · JPL
92247	2000 AY_{153}	—	January 2, 2000	Socorro	LINEAR	·	8.2 km	MPC · JPL
92248	2000 AM_{154}	—	January 2, 2000	Socorro	LINEAR	·	9.1 km	MPC · JPL
92249	2000 AN_{170}	—	January 7, 2000	Socorro	LINEAR	fast	9.5 km	MPC · JPL
92250	2000 AJ_{186}	—	January 8, 2000	Socorro	LINEAR	EOS	5.2 km	MPC · JPL
92251 Kuconis	2000 AF_{187}	Kuconis	January 8, 2000	Socorro	LINEAR	·	9.6 km	MPC · JPL
92252	2000 AQ_{187}	—	January 8, 2000	Socorro	LINEAR	·	8.9 km	MPC · JPL
92253	2000 AH_{189}	—	January 8, 2000	Socorro	LINEAR	·	4.6 km	MPC · JPL
92254	2000 AG_{199}	—	January 9, 2000	Socorro	LINEAR	·	5.2 km	MPC · JPL
92255	2000 AU_{199}	—	January 9, 2000	Socorro	LINEAR	HNS	4.7 km	MPC · JPL
92256	2000 AX_{200}	—	January 9, 2000	Socorro	LINEAR	·	5.5 km	MPC · JPL
92257	2000 AS_{233}	—	January 5, 2000	Socorro	LINEAR	·	7.0 km	MPC · JPL
92258	2000 AF_{245}	—	January 9, 2000	Socorro	LINEAR	·	7.5 km	MPC · JPL
92259	2000 AG_{245}	—	January 9, 2000	Socorro	LINEAR	LUT ·	8.2 km	MPC · JPL
92260	2000 BX_{4}	—	January 21, 2000	Socorro	LINEAR	·	6.1 km	MPC · JPL
92261	2000 BY_{5}	—	January 28, 2000	Socorro	LINEAR	·	10 km	MPC · JPL
92262	2000 BZ_{14}	—	January 31, 2000	Oizumi	T. Kobayashi	SYL · CYB	11 km	MPC · JPL
92263	2000 BC_{17}	—	January 30, 2000	Socorro	LINEAR	·	6.3 km	MPC · JPL
92264	2000 BW_{18}	—	January 29, 2000	Socorro	LINEAR	H	1.0 km	MPC · JPL
92265	2000 BO_{22}	—	January 26, 2000	Farra d'Isonzo	Farra d'Isonzo	CYB	7.2 km	MPC · JPL
92266	2000 BX_{24}	—	January 29, 2000	Socorro	LINEAR	H	1.0 km	MPC · JPL
92267	2000 BK_{26}	—	January 30, 2000	Socorro	LINEAR	·	6.3 km	MPC · JPL
92268	2000 BJ_{49}	—	January 27, 2000	Kitt Peak	Spacewatch	·	1.8 km	MPC · JPL
92269	2000 CM_{2}	—	February 2, 2000	Oizumi	T. Kobayashi	·	11 km	MPC · JPL
92270	2000 CU_{29}	—	February 2, 2000	Socorro	LINEAR	·	2.8 km	MPC · JPL
92271	2000 CS_{39}	—	February 2, 2000	Socorro	LINEAR	H	1.3 km	MPC · JPL
92272	2000 CB_{54}	—	February 2, 2000	Socorro	LINEAR	HIL · 3:2	14 km	MPC · JPL
92273	2000 CQ_{81}	—	February 4, 2000	Socorro	LINEAR	·	8.4 km	MPC · JPL
92274	2000 CO_{86}	—	February 4, 2000	Socorro	LINEAR	·	3.5 km	MPC · JPL
92275	2000 CS_{89}	—	February 4, 2000	Socorro	LINEAR	·	1.5 km	MPC · JPL
92276	2000 CC_{100}	—	February 10, 2000	Kitt Peak	Spacewatch	·	1.0 km	MPC · JPL
92277	2000 CT_{108}	—	February 5, 2000	Catalina	CSS	TIR	4.6 km	MPC · JPL
92278	2000 CB_{110}	—	February 5, 2000	Kitt Peak	M. W. Buie	·	860 m	MPC · JPL
92279 Bindiluca	2000 DG	Bindiluca	February 22, 2000	San Marcello	L. Tesi	·	9.1 km	MPC · JPL
92280	2000 DT_{5}	—	February 25, 2000	Socorro	LINEAR	H	1.6 km	MPC · JPL
92281	2000 DS_{8}	—	February 29, 2000	Prescott	P. G. Comba	3:2 · SHU	9.9 km	MPC · JPL
92282	2000 DP_{32}	—	February 29, 2000	Socorro	LINEAR	THB	6.4 km	MPC · JPL
92283	2000 DC_{45}	—	February 29, 2000	Socorro	LINEAR	3:2	11 km	MPC · JPL
92284	2000 DV_{76}	—	February 29, 2000	Socorro	LINEAR	3:2	6.3 km	MPC · JPL
92285	2000 EW	—	March 3, 2000	Višnjan Observatory	K. Korlević	·	1.6 km	MPC · JPL
92286	2000 EP_{7}	—	March 3, 2000	Kitt Peak	Spacewatch	·	990 m	MPC · JPL
92287	2000 EX_{14}	—	March 4, 2000	Socorro	LINEAR	HIL · 3:2 · (3561) · slow	10 km	MPC · JPL
92288	2000 ER_{43}	—	March 8, 2000	Socorro	LINEAR	·	1.2 km	MPC · JPL
92289	2000 EH_{49}	—	March 9, 2000	Socorro	LINEAR	·	1.5 km	MPC · JPL
92290	2000 EZ_{62}	—	March 10, 2000	Socorro	LINEAR	·	1.6 km	MPC · JPL
92291	2000 EZ_{85}	—	March 8, 2000	Socorro	LINEAR	·	2.1 km	MPC · JPL
92292	2000 EL_{88}	—	March 9, 2000	Socorro	LINEAR	H	1.9 km	MPC · JPL
92293	2000 EX_{105}	—	March 11, 2000	Anderson Mesa	LONEOS	·	1.4 km	MPC · JPL
92294	2000 EV_{112}	—	March 9, 2000	Socorro	LINEAR	·	1.6 km	MPC · JPL
92295	2000 EG_{113}	—	March 9, 2000	Socorro	LINEAR	·	1.5 km	MPC · JPL
92296	2000 EJ_{139}	—	March 11, 2000	Socorro	LINEAR	·	1.6 km	MPC · JPL
92297 Monrad	2000 EL_{156}	Monrad	March 10, 2000	Catalina	CSS	·	16 km	MPC · JPL
92298	2000 EE_{165}	—	March 3, 2000	Socorro	LINEAR	·	1.2 km	MPC · JPL
92299	2000 EB_{170}	—	March 5, 2000	Socorro	LINEAR	·	8.6 km	MPC · JPL
92300 Hagelin	2000 ET_{198}	Hagelin	March 1, 2000	Catalina	CSS	·	1.5 km	MPC · JPL

== 92301–92400 ==
back to top

Designation			Discovery			Properties		Ref
Permanent	Provisional	Named after	Date	Site	Discoverer(s)	Category	Diam.	Ref
92301	2000 FG	—	March 25, 2000	Prescott	P. G. Comba	·	1.2 km	MPC · JPL
92302	2000 FA_{11}	—	March 27, 2000	Socorro	LINEAR	H	1.4 km	MPC · JPL
92303	2000 FP_{15}	—	March 28, 2000	Socorro	LINEAR	·	1.5 km	MPC · JPL
92304	2000 FJ_{16}	—	March 28, 2000	Socorro	LINEAR	·	1.3 km	MPC · JPL
92305	2000 FB_{25}	—	March 29, 2000	Socorro	LINEAR	·	2.2 km	MPC · JPL
92306	2000 FL_{28}	—	March 27, 2000	Anderson Mesa	LONEOS	·	1.6 km	MPC · JPL
92307	2000 FR_{40}	—	March 29, 2000	Socorro	LINEAR	·	1.7 km	MPC · JPL
92308	2000 FM_{41}	—	March 29, 2000	Socorro	LINEAR	·	1.6 km	MPC · JPL
92309	2000 FV_{43}	—	March 29, 2000	Socorro	LINEAR	·	1.4 km	MPC · JPL
92310	2000 FX_{43}	—	March 29, 2000	Socorro	LINEAR	·	1.5 km	MPC · JPL
92311	2000 FQ_{45}	—	March 29, 2000	Socorro	LINEAR	·	3.0 km	MPC · JPL
92312	2000 FJ_{46}	—	March 29, 2000	Socorro	LINEAR	·	1.5 km	MPC · JPL
92313	2000 FY_{46}	—	March 29, 2000	Socorro	LINEAR	·	1.7 km	MPC · JPL
92314	2000 GV_{1}	—	April 3, 2000	Reedy Creek	J. Broughton	PHO	2.5 km	MPC · JPL
92315	2000 GW_{4}	—	April 7, 2000	Socorro	LINEAR	·	1.3 km	MPC · JPL
92316	2000 GX_{6}	—	April 4, 2000	Socorro	LINEAR	·	1.2 km	MPC · JPL
92317	2000 GG_{19}	—	April 5, 2000	Socorro	LINEAR	·	1.3 km	MPC · JPL
92318	2000 GW_{25}	—	April 5, 2000	Socorro	LINEAR	·	1.4 km	MPC · JPL
92319	2000 GT_{26}	—	April 5, 2000	Socorro	LINEAR	·	1.1 km	MPC · JPL
92320	2000 GU_{26}	—	April 5, 2000	Socorro	LINEAR	·	1.5 km	MPC · JPL
92321	2000 GN_{31}	—	April 5, 2000	Socorro	LINEAR	·	1.1 km	MPC · JPL
92322	2000 GC_{39}	—	April 5, 2000	Socorro	LINEAR	·	1.1 km	MPC · JPL
92323	2000 GK_{46}	—	April 5, 2000	Socorro	LINEAR	·	1.7 km	MPC · JPL
92324	2000 GE_{49}	—	April 5, 2000	Socorro	LINEAR	·	1.5 km	MPC · JPL
92325	2000 GY_{50}	—	April 5, 2000	Socorro	LINEAR	·	1.4 km	MPC · JPL
92326	2000 GS_{53}	—	April 5, 2000	Socorro	LINEAR	3:2	11 km	MPC · JPL
92327	2000 GS_{55}	—	April 5, 2000	Socorro	LINEAR	·	1.6 km	MPC · JPL
92328	2000 GW_{60}	—	April 5, 2000	Socorro	LINEAR	·	1.3 km	MPC · JPL
92329	2000 GZ_{64}	—	April 5, 2000	Socorro	LINEAR	·	2.2 km	MPC · JPL
92330	2000 GY_{66}	—	April 5, 2000	Socorro	LINEAR	·	1.4 km	MPC · JPL
92331	2000 GV_{68}	—	April 5, 2000	Socorro	LINEAR	PHO	2.2 km	MPC · JPL
92332	2000 GM_{71}	—	April 5, 2000	Socorro	LINEAR	·	1.5 km	MPC · JPL
92333	2000 GF_{72}	—	April 5, 2000	Socorro	LINEAR	·	1.7 km	MPC · JPL
92334	2000 GJ_{78}	—	April 5, 2000	Socorro	LINEAR	·	1.1 km	MPC · JPL
92335	2000 GS_{80}	—	April 6, 2000	Socorro	LINEAR	·	1.3 km	MPC · JPL
92336	2000 GY_{81}	—	April 7, 2000	Socorro	LINEAR	H	1.5 km	MPC · JPL
92337	2000 GG_{96}	—	April 6, 2000	Socorro	LINEAR	·	1.7 km	MPC · JPL
92338	2000 GH_{96}	—	April 6, 2000	Socorro	LINEAR	·	1.8 km	MPC · JPL
92339	2000 GV_{99}	—	April 7, 2000	Socorro	LINEAR	·	2.3 km	MPC · JPL
92340	2000 GC_{109}	—	April 7, 2000	Socorro	LINEAR	·	1.4 km	MPC · JPL
92341	2000 GO_{110}	—	April 2, 2000	Anderson Mesa	LONEOS	·	1.4 km	MPC · JPL
92342	2000 GT_{136}	—	April 12, 2000	Socorro	LINEAR	·	2.1 km	MPC · JPL
92343	2000 GT_{141}	—	April 7, 2000	Anderson Mesa	LONEOS	·	1.3 km	MPC · JPL
92344	2000 GP_{147}	—	April 4, 2000	Anderson Mesa	LONEOS	T_{j} (2.98) · 3:2	11 km	MPC · JPL
92345	2000 GF_{158}	—	April 7, 2000	Anderson Mesa	LONEOS	·	2.8 km	MPC · JPL
92346	2000 GP_{159}	—	April 7, 2000	Socorro	LINEAR	·	3.8 km	MPC · JPL
92347	2000 GV_{160}	—	April 7, 2000	Anderson Mesa	LONEOS	·	1.2 km	MPC · JPL
92348	2000 GH_{168}	—	April 4, 2000	Anderson Mesa	LONEOS	·	3.1 km	MPC · JPL
92349	2000 HG_{4}	—	April 26, 2000	Kitt Peak	Spacewatch	·	1.1 km	MPC · JPL
92350	2000 HK_{5}	—	April 28, 2000	Prescott	P. G. Comba	·	1.8 km	MPC · JPL
92351	2000 HA_{7}	—	April 24, 2000	Kitt Peak	Spacewatch	·	1.3 km	MPC · JPL
92352	2000 HT_{11}	—	April 28, 2000	Socorro	LINEAR	·	1.2 km	MPC · JPL
92353	2000 HL_{14}	—	April 27, 2000	Socorro	LINEAR	·	11 km	MPC · JPL
92354	2000 HR_{14}	—	April 29, 2000	Prescott	P. G. Comba	·	1.3 km	MPC · JPL
92355	2000 HV_{14}	—	April 27, 2000	Socorro	LINEAR	·	1.6 km	MPC · JPL
92356	2000 HW_{14}	—	April 27, 2000	Socorro	LINEAR	·	1.2 km	MPC · JPL
92357	2000 HY_{21}	—	April 28, 2000	Socorro	LINEAR	·	1.6 km	MPC · JPL
92358	2000 HE_{23}	—	April 30, 2000	Socorro	LINEAR	·	1.4 km	MPC · JPL
92359	2000 HC_{24}	—	April 29, 2000	Socorro	LINEAR	·	1.8 km	MPC · JPL
92360	2000 HW_{24}	—	April 24, 2000	Anderson Mesa	LONEOS	·	2.1 km	MPC · JPL
92361	2000 HS_{28}	—	April 29, 2000	Socorro	LINEAR	PHO	2.4 km	MPC · JPL
92362	2000 HY_{29}	—	April 28, 2000	Socorro	LINEAR	·	1.5 km	MPC · JPL
92363	2000 HO_{31}	—	April 29, 2000	Socorro	LINEAR	·	1.7 km	MPC · JPL
92364	2000 HN_{32}	—	April 29, 2000	Socorro	LINEAR	·	1.7 km	MPC · JPL
92365	2000 HP_{32}	—	April 29, 2000	Socorro	LINEAR	·	2.2 km	MPC · JPL
92366	2000 HL_{41}	—	April 28, 2000	Socorro	LINEAR	·	1.3 km	MPC · JPL
92367	2000 HF_{42}	—	April 29, 2000	Socorro	LINEAR	·	1.3 km	MPC · JPL
92368	2000 HC_{47}	—	April 29, 2000	Socorro	LINEAR	·	1.3 km	MPC · JPL
92369	2000 HC_{48}	—	April 29, 2000	Socorro	LINEAR	·	1.3 km	MPC · JPL
92370	2000 HP_{50}	—	April 29, 2000	Socorro	LINEAR	NYS	3.1 km	MPC · JPL
92371	2000 HQ_{50}	—	April 29, 2000	Socorro	LINEAR	·	1.4 km	MPC · JPL
92372	2000 HP_{52}	—	April 29, 2000	Socorro	LINEAR	·	1.7 km	MPC · JPL
92373	2000 HR_{52}	—	April 29, 2000	Socorro	LINEAR	·	1.9 km	MPC · JPL
92374	2000 HX_{53}	—	April 29, 2000	Socorro	LINEAR	·	1.7 km	MPC · JPL
92375	2000 HP_{55}	—	April 24, 2000	Anderson Mesa	LONEOS	·	1.6 km	MPC · JPL
92376	2000 HH_{58}	—	April 24, 2000	Kitt Peak	Spacewatch	·	2.7 km	MPC · JPL
92377	2000 HX_{58}	—	April 25, 2000	Anderson Mesa	LONEOS	·	1.4 km	MPC · JPL
92378	2000 HA_{60}	—	April 25, 2000	Anderson Mesa	LONEOS	·	1.2 km	MPC · JPL
92379	2000 HO_{68}	—	April 28, 2000	Kitt Peak	Spacewatch	(2076)	1.5 km	MPC · JPL
92380	2000 HS_{68}	—	April 28, 2000	Kitt Peak	Spacewatch	·	1.4 km	MPC · JPL
92381	2000 HT_{69}	—	April 26, 2000	Anderson Mesa	LONEOS	·	1.2 km	MPC · JPL
92382	2000 HT_{72}	—	April 26, 2000	Kitt Peak	Spacewatch	·	1.1 km	MPC · JPL
92383	2000 HE_{75}	—	April 27, 2000	Socorro	LINEAR	·	2.0 km	MPC · JPL
92384	2000 HS_{75}	—	April 27, 2000	Socorro	LINEAR	V	1.3 km	MPC · JPL
92385	2000 HL_{81}	—	April 29, 2000	Socorro	LINEAR	·	1.4 km	MPC · JPL
92386	2000 HG_{87}	—	April 30, 2000	Haleakala	NEAT	·	1.4 km	MPC · JPL
92387	2000 HA_{93}	—	April 29, 2000	Socorro	LINEAR	·	1.0 km	MPC · JPL
92388	2000 JP	—	May 1, 2000	Socorro	LINEAR	·	1.6 km	MPC · JPL
92389 Gretskij	2000 JZ_{3}	Gretskij	May 3, 2000	Ondřejov	P. Pravec, P. Kušnirák	·	1.3 km	MPC · JPL
92390	2000 JU_{5}	—	May 1, 2000	Socorro	LINEAR	·	1.5 km	MPC · JPL
92391	2000 JE_{7}	—	May 1, 2000	Haleakala	NEAT	·	2.8 km	MPC · JPL
92392	2000 JL_{9}	—	May 3, 2000	Socorro	LINEAR	·	1.4 km	MPC · JPL
92393	2000 JX_{12}	—	May 9, 2000	Socorro	LINEAR	·	1.5 km	MPC · JPL
92394	2000 JW_{17}	—	May 6, 2000	Socorro	LINEAR	·	3.6 km	MPC · JPL
92395	2000 JK_{20}	—	May 6, 2000	Socorro	LINEAR	·	1.3 km	MPC · JPL
92396	2000 JM_{21}	—	May 6, 2000	Socorro	LINEAR	·	1.4 km	MPC · JPL
92397	2000 JV_{21}	—	May 6, 2000	Socorro	LINEAR	·	3.0 km	MPC · JPL
92398	2000 JM_{23}	—	May 7, 2000	Socorro	LINEAR	·	1.9 km	MPC · JPL
92399	2000 JH_{24}	—	May 7, 2000	Socorro	LINEAR	·	1.5 km	MPC · JPL
92400	2000 JF_{25}	—	May 7, 2000	Socorro	LINEAR	·	1.9 km	MPC · JPL

== 92401–92500 ==
back to top

Designation			Discovery			Properties		Ref
Permanent	Provisional	Named after	Date	Site	Discoverer(s)	Category	Diam.	Ref
92401	2000 JL_{25}	—	May 7, 2000	Socorro	LINEAR	·	1.5 km	MPC · JPL
92402	2000 JC_{28}	—	May 7, 2000	Socorro	LINEAR	·	1.4 km	MPC · JPL
92403	2000 JX_{28}	—	May 7, 2000	Socorro	LINEAR	·	1.7 km	MPC · JPL
92404	2000 JB_{29}	—	May 7, 2000	Socorro	LINEAR	·	1.3 km	MPC · JPL
92405	2000 JH_{32}	—	May 7, 2000	Socorro	LINEAR	·	1.5 km	MPC · JPL
92406	2000 JN_{32}	—	May 7, 2000	Socorro	LINEAR	(2076)	2.2 km	MPC · JPL
92407	2000 JM_{34}	—	May 7, 2000	Socorro	LINEAR	·	2.9 km	MPC · JPL
92408	2000 JZ_{34}	—	May 7, 2000	Socorro	LINEAR	·	1.7 km	MPC · JPL
92409	2000 JW_{35}	—	May 7, 2000	Socorro	LINEAR	·	1.8 km	MPC · JPL
92410	2000 JA_{36}	—	May 7, 2000	Socorro	LINEAR	·	1.7 km	MPC · JPL
92411	2000 JC_{37}	—	May 7, 2000	Socorro	LINEAR	(2076)	1.8 km	MPC · JPL
92412	2000 JX_{38}	—	May 7, 2000	Socorro	LINEAR	·	1.4 km	MPC · JPL
92413	2000 JN_{39}	—	May 7, 2000	Socorro	LINEAR	·	1.1 km	MPC · JPL
92414	2000 JU_{40}	—	May 6, 2000	Socorro	LINEAR	·	1.3 km	MPC · JPL
92415	2000 JP_{42}	—	May 7, 2000	Socorro	LINEAR	·	1.3 km	MPC · JPL
92416	2000 JS_{42}	—	May 7, 2000	Socorro	LINEAR	·	1.1 km	MPC · JPL
92417	2000 JQ_{44}	—	May 7, 2000	Socorro	LINEAR	·	2.2 km	MPC · JPL
92418	2000 JP_{45}	—	May 7, 2000	Socorro	LINEAR	·	1.4 km	MPC · JPL
92419	2000 JG_{46}	—	May 7, 2000	Socorro	LINEAR	NYS	1.8 km	MPC · JPL
92420	2000 JJ_{48}	—	May 9, 2000	Socorro	LINEAR	·	2.0 km	MPC · JPL
92421	2000 JM_{48}	—	May 9, 2000	Socorro	LINEAR	·	3.0 km	MPC · JPL
92422	2000 JO_{48}	—	May 9, 2000	Socorro	LINEAR	·	2.0 km	MPC · JPL
92423	2000 JZ_{49}	—	May 9, 2000	Socorro	LINEAR	·	1.4 km	MPC · JPL
92424	2000 JO_{50}	—	May 9, 2000	Socorro	LINEAR	·	1.7 km	MPC · JPL
92425	2000 JR_{54}	—	May 6, 2000	Socorro	LINEAR	·	1.7 km	MPC · JPL
92426	2000 JD_{55}	—	May 6, 2000	Socorro	LINEAR	·	2.2 km	MPC · JPL
92427	2000 JD_{56}	—	May 6, 2000	Socorro	LINEAR	·	1.8 km	MPC · JPL
92428	2000 JM_{60}	—	May 7, 2000	Socorro	LINEAR	·	1.4 km	MPC · JPL
92429	2000 JT_{63}	—	May 9, 2000	Socorro	LINEAR	·	1.7 km	MPC · JPL
92430	2000 JW_{63}	—	May 10, 2000	Socorro	LINEAR	·	1.7 km	MPC · JPL
92431	2000 JO_{65}	—	May 6, 2000	Socorro	LINEAR	·	1.5 km	MPC · JPL
92432	2000 JQ_{65}	—	May 6, 2000	Socorro	LINEAR	·	1.4 km	MPC · JPL
92433	2000 JN_{66}	—	May 6, 2000	Socorro	LINEAR	PHO	4.9 km	MPC · JPL
92434	2000 JV_{71}	—	May 1, 2000	Anderson Mesa	LONEOS	·	1.4 km	MPC · JPL
92435	2000 JW_{73}	—	May 2, 2000	Kitt Peak	Spacewatch	·	1.4 km	MPC · JPL
92436	2000 JX_{76}	—	May 7, 2000	Socorro	LINEAR	·	1.6 km	MPC · JPL
92437	2000 JZ_{80}	—	May 1, 2000	Haleakala	NEAT	·	1.4 km	MPC · JPL
92438	2000 JX_{85}	—	May 2, 2000	Anderson Mesa	LONEOS	·	1.5 km	MPC · JPL
92439	2000 KD	—	May 24, 2000	Kitt Peak	Spacewatch	·	1.6 km	MPC · JPL
92440	2000 KG_{1}	—	May 24, 2000	Ondřejov	L. Kotková	·	1.5 km	MPC · JPL
92441	2000 KY_{1}	—	May 26, 2000	Črni Vrh	Mikuž, H.	·	1.6 km	MPC · JPL
92442	2000 KF_{4}	—	May 27, 2000	Reedy Creek	J. Broughton	·	1.8 km	MPC · JPL
92443	2000 KS_{4}	—	May 27, 2000	Socorro	LINEAR	·	2.6 km	MPC · JPL
92444	2000 KG_{5}	—	May 28, 2000	Socorro	LINEAR	·	2.0 km	MPC · JPL
92445	2000 KL_{5}	—	May 28, 2000	Socorro	LINEAR	·	2.4 km	MPC · JPL
92446	2000 KS_{6}	—	May 27, 2000	Socorro	LINEAR	·	2.0 km	MPC · JPL
92447	2000 KR_{7}	—	May 27, 2000	Socorro	LINEAR	·	2.0 km	MPC · JPL
92448	2000 KC_{9}	—	May 28, 2000	Socorro	LINEAR	·	1.3 km	MPC · JPL
92449	2000 KU_{10}	—	May 28, 2000	Socorro	LINEAR	·	1.4 km	MPC · JPL
92450	2000 KW_{13}	—	May 28, 2000	Socorro	LINEAR	·	1.3 km	MPC · JPL
92451	2000 KS_{20}	—	May 28, 2000	Socorro	LINEAR	NYS	2.3 km	MPC · JPL
92452	2000 KV_{20}	—	May 28, 2000	Socorro	LINEAR	·	1.2 km	MPC · JPL
92453	2000 KZ_{21}	—	May 28, 2000	Socorro	LINEAR	·	1.4 km	MPC · JPL
92454	2000 KV_{25}	—	May 28, 2000	Socorro	LINEAR	·	1.6 km	MPC · JPL
92455	2000 KQ_{28}	—	May 28, 2000	Socorro	LINEAR	·	1.9 km	MPC · JPL
92456	2000 KB_{34}	—	May 29, 2000	Reedy Creek	J. Broughton	(2076)	2.5 km	MPC · JPL
92457	2000 KY_{34}	—	May 27, 2000	Socorro	LINEAR	·	1.9 km	MPC · JPL
92458	2000 KO_{35}	—	May 27, 2000	Socorro	LINEAR	·	1.3 km	MPC · JPL
92459	2000 KC_{39}	—	May 24, 2000	Kitt Peak	Spacewatch	·	2.1 km	MPC · JPL
92460	2000 KT_{39}	—	May 24, 2000	Kitt Peak	Spacewatch	·	1.5 km	MPC · JPL
92461	2000 KQ_{43}	—	May 26, 2000	Kitt Peak	Spacewatch	·	1.2 km	MPC · JPL
92462	2000 KB_{55}	—	May 27, 2000	Socorro	LINEAR	·	1.7 km	MPC · JPL
92463	2000 KB_{56}	—	May 27, 2000	Socorro	LINEAR	·	2.0 km	MPC · JPL
92464	2000 KS_{56}	—	May 27, 2000	Socorro	LINEAR	·	2.5 km	MPC · JPL
92465	2000 KB_{57}	—	May 28, 2000	Socorro	LINEAR	·	4.5 km	MPC · JPL
92466	2000 KS_{57}	—	May 24, 2000	Anderson Mesa	LONEOS	·	4.2 km	MPC · JPL
92467	2000 KY_{58}	—	May 24, 2000	Anderson Mesa	LONEOS	·	1.5 km	MPC · JPL
92468	2000 KU_{60}	—	May 25, 2000	Anderson Mesa	LONEOS	·	1.2 km	MPC · JPL
92469	2000 KX_{62}	—	May 26, 2000	Anderson Mesa	LONEOS	·	3.5 km	MPC · JPL
92470	2000 KK_{63}	—	May 26, 2000	Anderson Mesa	LONEOS	·	1.5 km	MPC · JPL
92471	2000 KX_{69}	—	May 29, 2000	Kitt Peak	Spacewatch	·	1.6 km	MPC · JPL
92472	2000 KR_{70}	—	May 28, 2000	Anderson Mesa	LONEOS	·	1.3 km	MPC · JPL
92473	2000 LP	—	June 2, 2000	Reedy Creek	J. Broughton	·	1.6 km	MPC · JPL
92474	2000 LF_{4}	—	June 4, 2000	Socorro	LINEAR	·	2.5 km	MPC · JPL
92475	2000 LQ_{4}	—	June 5, 2000	Socorro	LINEAR	·	1.7 km	MPC · JPL
92476	2000 LA_{5}	—	June 5, 2000	Socorro	LINEAR	·	2.2 km	MPC · JPL
92477	2000 LP_{5}	—	June 5, 2000	Socorro	LINEAR	·	1.9 km	MPC · JPL
92478	2000 LA_{8}	—	June 6, 2000	Socorro	LINEAR	·	2.6 km	MPC · JPL
92479	2000 LZ_{8}	—	June 5, 2000	Socorro	LINEAR	·	1.7 km	MPC · JPL
92480	2000 LM_{9}	—	June 5, 2000	Socorro	LINEAR	(2076)	1.7 km	MPC · JPL
92481	2000 LC_{11}	—	June 4, 2000	Socorro	LINEAR	PHO	2.2 km	MPC · JPL
92482	2000 LQ_{13}	—	June 6, 2000	Socorro	LINEAR	·	1.7 km	MPC · JPL
92483	2000 LL_{20}	—	June 8, 2000	Socorro	LINEAR	PHO	3.4 km	MPC · JPL
92484	2000 LV_{21}	—	June 8, 2000	Socorro	LINEAR	·	2.2 km	MPC · JPL
92485	2000 LM_{23}	—	June 10, 2000	Kitt Peak	Spacewatch	V	1.2 km	MPC · JPL
92486	2000 LR_{30}	—	June 9, 2000	Haleakala	NEAT	EUN	3.7 km	MPC · JPL
92487	2000 LL_{31}	—	June 5, 2000	Anderson Mesa	LONEOS	·	1.6 km	MPC · JPL
92488	2000 LH_{36}	—	June 1, 2000	Haleakala	NEAT	·	2.0 km	MPC · JPL
92489	2000 MK	—	June 24, 2000	Tebbutt	F. B. Zoltowski	·	1.6 km	MPC · JPL
92490	2000 MG_{2}	—	June 29, 2000	Reedy Creek	J. Broughton	MAS	1.8 km	MPC · JPL
92491	2000 MA_{3}	—	June 29, 2000	Reedy Creek	J. Broughton	·	3.5 km	MPC · JPL
92492	2000 MV_{3}	—	June 24, 2000	Socorro	LINEAR	·	4.4 km	MPC · JPL
92493	2000 MX_{4}	—	June 25, 2000	Socorro	LINEAR	NYS	2.8 km	MPC · JPL
92494	2000 MH_{6}	—	June 24, 2000	Socorro	LINEAR	·	3.0 km	MPC · JPL
92495	2000 NY	—	July 4, 2000	Prescott	P. G. Comba	·	1.7 km	MPC · JPL
92496	2000 NB_{2}	—	July 5, 2000	Reedy Creek	J. Broughton	·	2.1 km	MPC · JPL
92497	2000 NQ_{2}	—	July 3, 2000	Socorro	LINEAR	ERI	3.6 km	MPC · JPL
92498	2000 NH_{9}	—	July 7, 2000	Socorro	LINEAR	·	2.4 km	MPC · JPL
92499	2000 NQ_{13}	—	July 5, 2000	Anderson Mesa	LONEOS	·	3.2 km	MPC · JPL
92500	2000 NY_{13}	—	July 5, 2000	Anderson Mesa	LONEOS	·	1.8 km	MPC · JPL

== 92501–92600 ==
back to top

Designation			Discovery			Properties		Ref
Permanent	Provisional	Named after	Date	Site	Discoverer(s)	Category	Diam.	Ref
92501	2000 NF_{15}	—	July 5, 2000	Anderson Mesa	LONEOS	·	2.1 km	MPC · JPL
92502	2000 NP_{15}	—	July 5, 2000	Anderson Mesa	LONEOS	V	2.0 km	MPC · JPL
92503	2000 NQ_{15}	—	July 5, 2000	Anderson Mesa	LONEOS	·	1.8 km	MPC · JPL
92504	2000 NR_{15}	—	July 5, 2000	Anderson Mesa	LONEOS	NYS	2.6 km	MPC · JPL
92505	2000 NK_{16}	—	July 5, 2000	Anderson Mesa	LONEOS	NYS	1.9 km	MPC · JPL
92506	2000 NU_{16}	—	July 5, 2000	Anderson Mesa	LONEOS	·	4.8 km	MPC · JPL
92507	2000 NS_{17}	—	July 5, 2000	Anderson Mesa	LONEOS	V	1.6 km	MPC · JPL
92508	2000 NT_{17}	—	July 5, 2000	Anderson Mesa	LONEOS	·	3.9 km	MPC · JPL
92509	2000 NU_{18}	—	July 5, 2000	Anderson Mesa	LONEOS	·	2.7 km	MPC · JPL
92510	2000 NH_{19}	—	July 5, 2000	Anderson Mesa	LONEOS	·	2.2 km	MPC · JPL
92511	2000 NK_{20}	—	July 6, 2000	Kitt Peak	Spacewatch	·	1.8 km	MPC · JPL
92512	2000 NN_{20}	—	July 6, 2000	Kitt Peak	Spacewatch	NYS	2.0 km	MPC · JPL
92513	2000 NW_{20}	—	July 6, 2000	Anderson Mesa	LONEOS	·	2.2 km	MPC · JPL
92514	2000 ND_{21}	—	July 6, 2000	Anderson Mesa	LONEOS	·	2.8 km	MPC · JPL
92515	2000 NZ_{21}	—	July 7, 2000	Socorro	LINEAR	·	2.0 km	MPC · JPL
92516	2000 ND_{25}	—	July 4, 2000	Anderson Mesa	LONEOS	·	3.0 km	MPC · JPL
92517	2000 NZ_{25}	—	July 4, 2000	Anderson Mesa	LONEOS	·	2.0 km	MPC · JPL
92518	2000 NR_{26}	—	July 4, 2000	Anderson Mesa	LONEOS	·	2.3 km	MPC · JPL
92519	2000 NO_{27}	—	July 4, 2000	Anderson Mesa	LONEOS	·	2.7 km	MPC · JPL
92520	2000 NH_{28}	—	July 3, 2000	Socorro	LINEAR	·	2.6 km	MPC · JPL
92521	2000 NM_{28}	—	July 3, 2000	Socorro	LINEAR	·	2.1 km	MPC · JPL
92522	2000 NS_{28}	—	July 2, 2000	Kitt Peak	Spacewatch	·	2.8 km	MPC · JPL
92523	2000 NO_{29}	—	July 4, 2000	Anderson Mesa	LONEOS	NYS	2.2 km	MPC · JPL
92524	2000 ON_{1}	—	July 25, 2000	Kitt Peak	Spacewatch	·	1.6 km	MPC · JPL
92525 Delucchi	2000 OV_{2}	Delucchi	July 28, 2000	Gnosca	S. Sposetti	·	2.1 km	MPC · JPL
92526	2000 OB_{3}	—	July 23, 2000	Socorro	LINEAR	PHO	4.6 km	MPC · JPL
92527	2000 OJ_{7}	—	July 30, 2000	Lake Tekapo	Lake Tekapo	·	1.5 km	MPC · JPL
92528	2000 OQ_{8}	—	July 23, 2000	Socorro	LINEAR	PHO	2.0 km	MPC · JPL
92529	2000 OK_{11}	—	July 23, 2000	Socorro	LINEAR	·	4.0 km	MPC · JPL
92530	2000 OM_{13}	—	July 23, 2000	Socorro	LINEAR	NYS	1.8 km	MPC · JPL
92531	2000 OD_{14}	—	July 23, 2000	Socorro	LINEAR	V	1.3 km	MPC · JPL
92532	2000 OJ_{14}	—	July 23, 2000	Socorro	LINEAR	·	2.5 km	MPC · JPL
92533	2000 OQ_{14}	—	July 23, 2000	Socorro	LINEAR	·	2.0 km	MPC · JPL
92534	2000 OW_{15}	—	July 23, 2000	Socorro	LINEAR	NYS	2.3 km	MPC · JPL
92535	2000 OX_{15}	—	July 23, 2000	Socorro	LINEAR	·	2.4 km	MPC · JPL
92536	2000 OE_{16}	—	July 23, 2000	Socorro	LINEAR	NYS	2.8 km	MPC · JPL
92537	2000 OS_{16}	—	July 23, 2000	Socorro	LINEAR	·	2.3 km	MPC · JPL
92538	2000 OF_{18}	—	July 23, 2000	Socorro	LINEAR	NYS	2.6 km	MPC · JPL
92539	2000 OB_{19}	—	July 23, 2000	Socorro	LINEAR	·	3.7 km	MPC · JPL
92540	2000 OA_{20}	—	July 30, 2000	Socorro	LINEAR	·	3.4 km	MPC · JPL
92541	2000 OX_{20}	—	July 31, 2000	Socorro	LINEAR	HNS	3.6 km	MPC · JPL
92542	2000 OW_{21}	—	July 31, 2000	Bergisch Gladbach	W. Bickel	·	2.6 km	MPC · JPL
92543	2000 OB_{27}	—	July 23, 2000	Socorro	LINEAR	·	2.5 km	MPC · JPL
92544	2000 OE_{27}	—	July 23, 2000	Socorro	LINEAR	·	3.2 km	MPC · JPL
92545	2000 OV_{30}	—	July 30, 2000	Socorro	LINEAR	V	1.3 km	MPC · JPL
92546	2000 OF_{31}	—	July 30, 2000	Socorro	LINEAR	·	3.0 km	MPC · JPL
92547	2000 OC_{32}	—	July 30, 2000	Socorro	LINEAR	·	1.9 km	MPC · JPL
92548	2000 OX_{33}	—	July 30, 2000	Socorro	LINEAR	·	2.6 km	MPC · JPL
92549	2000 OK_{34}	—	July 30, 2000	Socorro	LINEAR	·	2.3 km	MPC · JPL
92550	2000 OX_{34}	—	July 30, 2000	Socorro	LINEAR	·	2.2 km	MPC · JPL
92551	2000 OV_{36}	—	July 30, 2000	Socorro	LINEAR	·	2.9 km	MPC · JPL
92552	2000 OZ_{36}	—	July 30, 2000	Socorro	LINEAR	·	4.4 km	MPC · JPL
92553	2000 OR_{37}	—	July 30, 2000	Socorro	LINEAR	·	2.2 km	MPC · JPL
92554	2000 OK_{38}	—	July 30, 2000	Socorro	LINEAR	·	3.0 km	MPC · JPL
92555	2000 OZ_{38}	—	July 30, 2000	Socorro	LINEAR	·	5.6 km	MPC · JPL
92556	2000 OP_{39}	—	July 30, 2000	Socorro	LINEAR	·	3.5 km	MPC · JPL
92557	2000 OY_{40}	—	July 30, 2000	Socorro	LINEAR	·	2.8 km	MPC · JPL
92558	2000 OD_{43}	—	July 30, 2000	Socorro	LINEAR	·	2.0 km	MPC · JPL
92559	2000 OO_{45}	—	July 30, 2000	Socorro	LINEAR	·	3.2 km	MPC · JPL
92560	2000 OX_{45}	—	July 30, 2000	Socorro	LINEAR	·	4.4 km	MPC · JPL
92561	2000 OK_{46}	—	July 31, 2000	Socorro	LINEAR	V	2.2 km	MPC · JPL
92562	2000 OX_{50}	—	July 31, 2000	Socorro	LINEAR	·	4.1 km	MPC · JPL
92563	2000 OZ_{50}	—	July 30, 2000	Reedy Creek	J. Broughton	MAS	1.4 km	MPC · JPL
92564	2000 OQ_{51}	—	July 30, 2000	Socorro	LINEAR	·	3.7 km	MPC · JPL
92565	2000 ON_{52}	—	July 30, 2000	Socorro	LINEAR	·	2.5 km	MPC · JPL
92566	2000 OM_{53}	—	July 30, 2000	Socorro	LINEAR	V	2.8 km	MPC · JPL
92567	2000 OU_{55}	—	July 29, 2000	Anderson Mesa	LONEOS	MAS	1.7 km	MPC · JPL
92568	2000 OJ_{56}	—	July 29, 2000	Anderson Mesa	LONEOS	·	2.5 km	MPC · JPL
92569	2000 OC_{58}	—	July 29, 2000	Anderson Mesa	LONEOS	MAS	1.4 km	MPC · JPL
92570	2000 OE_{58}	—	July 29, 2000	Anderson Mesa	LONEOS	·	2.3 km	MPC · JPL
92571	2000 OF_{58}	—	July 29, 2000	Anderson Mesa	LONEOS	·	2.4 km	MPC · JPL
92572	2000 ON_{58}	—	July 29, 2000	Anderson Mesa	LONEOS	·	1.4 km	MPC · JPL
92573	2000 OZ_{58}	—	July 29, 2000	Anderson Mesa	LONEOS	·	2.4 km	MPC · JPL
92574	2000 OE_{59}	—	July 29, 2000	Anderson Mesa	LONEOS	·	2.4 km	MPC · JPL
92575	2000 OJ_{59}	—	July 29, 2000	Anderson Mesa	LONEOS	·	2.8 km	MPC · JPL
92576	2000 OY_{59}	—	July 29, 2000	Anderson Mesa	LONEOS	·	2.4 km	MPC · JPL
92577	2000 OD_{60}	—	July 29, 2000	Anderson Mesa	LONEOS	V	1.4 km	MPC · JPL
92578 Benecchi	2000 OC_{62}	Benecchi	July 30, 2000	Cerro Tololo	Kern, S. D.	·	2.2 km	MPC · JPL
92579 Dwight	2000 OK_{69}	Dwight	July 31, 2000	Cerro Tololo	M. W. Buie	·	1.8 km	MPC · JPL
92580	2000 PZ	—	August 1, 2000	Socorro	LINEAR	·	1.5 km	MPC · JPL
92581	2000 PY_{1}	—	August 1, 2000	Socorro	LINEAR	·	2.1 km	MPC · JPL
92582	2000 PZ_{1}	—	August 1, 2000	Socorro	LINEAR	V	1.6 km	MPC · JPL
92583	2000 PA_{2}	—	August 1, 2000	Socorro	LINEAR	NYS	2.5 km	MPC · JPL
92584	2000 PW_{2}	—	August 2, 2000	Socorro	LINEAR	·	5.1 km	MPC · JPL
92585 Fumagalli	2000 PP_{8}	Fumagalli	August 7, 2000	Gnosca	S. Sposetti	NYS	2.3 km	MPC · JPL
92586 Jaxonpowell	2000 PS_{8}	Jaxonpowell	August 9, 2000	Emerald Lane	L. Ball	V	1.6 km	MPC · JPL
92587	2000 PH_{9}	—	August 6, 2000	Siding Spring	R. H. McNaught	·	4.5 km	MPC · JPL
92588	2000 PJ_{11}	—	August 1, 2000	Socorro	LINEAR	·	4.5 km	MPC · JPL
92589	2000 PO_{12}	—	August 3, 2000	Socorro	LINEAR	·	4.2 km	MPC · JPL
92590	2000 PT_{13}	—	August 1, 2000	Socorro	LINEAR	·	2.2 km	MPC · JPL
92591	2000 PX_{14}	—	August 1, 2000	Socorro	LINEAR	·	2.7 km	MPC · JPL
92592	2000 PV_{15}	—	August 1, 2000	Socorro	LINEAR	V	1.4 km	MPC · JPL
92593	2000 PN_{16}	—	August 1, 2000	Socorro	LINEAR	·	2.9 km	MPC · JPL
92594	2000 PV_{16}	—	August 1, 2000	Socorro	LINEAR	·	2.1 km	MPC · JPL
92595	2000 PE_{17}	—	August 1, 2000	Socorro	LINEAR	V	1.2 km	MPC · JPL
92596	2000 PN_{18}	—	August 1, 2000	Socorro	LINEAR	·	2.6 km	MPC · JPL
92597	2000 PE_{19}	—	August 1, 2000	Socorro	LINEAR	·	2.6 km	MPC · JPL
92598	2000 PM_{19}	—	August 1, 2000	Socorro	LINEAR	·	1.5 km	MPC · JPL
92599	2000 PR_{19}	—	August 1, 2000	Socorro	LINEAR	·	2.7 km	MPC · JPL
92600	2000 PW_{19}	—	August 1, 2000	Socorro	LINEAR	·	2.6 km	MPC · JPL

== 92601–92700 ==
back to top

Designation			Discovery			Properties		Ref
Permanent	Provisional	Named after	Date	Site	Discoverer(s)	Category	Diam.	Ref
92601	2000 PL_{20}	—	August 1, 2000	Socorro	LINEAR	NYS	2.0 km	MPC · JPL
92602	2000 PO_{20}	—	August 1, 2000	Socorro	LINEAR	·	2.8 km	MPC · JPL
92603	2000 PF_{21}	—	August 1, 2000	Socorro	LINEAR	MAS	1.4 km	MPC · JPL
92604	2000 PZ_{21}	—	August 1, 2000	Socorro	LINEAR	·	2.4 km	MPC · JPL
92605	2000 PR_{22}	—	August 2, 2000	Socorro	LINEAR	PHO	1.8 km	MPC · JPL
92606	2000 PB_{23}	—	August 2, 2000	Socorro	LINEAR	(5)	2.9 km	MPC · JPL
92607	2000 PM_{23}	—	August 2, 2000	Socorro	LINEAR	·	2.4 km	MPC · JPL
92608	2000 PR_{23}	—	August 2, 2000	Socorro	LINEAR	·	2.7 km	MPC · JPL
92609	2000 PO_{24}	—	August 2, 2000	Socorro	LINEAR	·	3.1 km	MPC · JPL
92610	2000 PP_{24}	—	August 2, 2000	Kitt Peak	Spacewatch	·	2.4 km	MPC · JPL
92611	2000 PK_{26}	—	August 5, 2000	Haleakala	NEAT	EUN	2.9 km	MPC · JPL
92612	2000 PZ_{26}	—	August 9, 2000	Socorro	LINEAR	·	5.3 km	MPC · JPL
92613	2000 QO	—	August 21, 2000	Prescott	P. G. Comba	·	2.0 km	MPC · JPL
92614 Kazutami	2000 QY	Kazutami	August 23, 2000	Gnosca	S. Sposetti	·	4.8 km	MPC · JPL
92615	2000 QR_{1}	—	August 23, 2000	Gnosca	S. Sposetti	·	2.0 km	MPC · JPL
92616	2000 QU_{1}	—	August 24, 2000	Gnosca	S. Sposetti	PHO	3.3 km	MPC · JPL
92617	2000 QU_{3}	—	August 24, 2000	Socorro	LINEAR	NYS	2.6 km	MPC · JPL
92618	2000 QU_{4}	—	August 24, 2000	Socorro	LINEAR	·	3.8 km	MPC · JPL
92619	2000 QW_{4}	—	August 24, 2000	Socorro	LINEAR	·	1.5 km	MPC · JPL
92620	2000 QG_{5}	—	August 24, 2000	Socorro	LINEAR	·	5.3 km	MPC · JPL
92621	2000 QY_{5}	—	August 24, 2000	Socorro	LINEAR	·	2.1 km	MPC · JPL
92622	2000 QB_{6}	—	August 24, 2000	Socorro	LINEAR	PHO	2.7 km	MPC · JPL
92623	2000 QB_{8}	—	August 25, 2000	Višnjan Observatory	K. Korlević, M. Jurić	V	1.9 km	MPC · JPL
92624	2000 QJ_{10}	—	August 24, 2000	Socorro	LINEAR	MAS	1.6 km	MPC · JPL
92625	2000 QY_{12}	—	August 24, 2000	Socorro	LINEAR	NYS	2.1 km	MPC · JPL
92626	2000 QJ_{13}	—	August 24, 2000	Socorro	LINEAR	·	2.1 km	MPC · JPL
92627	2000 QW_{13}	—	August 24, 2000	Socorro	LINEAR	·	2.0 km	MPC · JPL
92628	2000 QF_{14}	—	August 24, 2000	Socorro	LINEAR	MAS	1.3 km	MPC · JPL
92629	2000 QD_{15}	—	August 24, 2000	Socorro	LINEAR	NYS	2.4 km	MPC · JPL
92630	2000 QG_{15}	—	August 24, 2000	Socorro	LINEAR	·	2.3 km	MPC · JPL
92631	2000 QE_{17}	—	August 24, 2000	Socorro	LINEAR	·	2.9 km	MPC · JPL
92632	2000 QH_{17}	—	August 24, 2000	Socorro	LINEAR	·	1.8 km	MPC · JPL
92633	2000 QM_{18}	—	August 24, 2000	Socorro	LINEAR	NYS	2.1 km	MPC · JPL
92634	2000 QN_{19}	—	August 24, 2000	Socorro	LINEAR	CLA	3.0 km	MPC · JPL
92635	2000 QP_{20}	—	August 24, 2000	Socorro	LINEAR	V	1.9 km	MPC · JPL
92636	2000 QS_{20}	—	August 24, 2000	Socorro	LINEAR	·	3.8 km	MPC · JPL
92637	2000 QL_{21}	—	August 24, 2000	Socorro	LINEAR	·	3.0 km	MPC · JPL
92638	2000 QO_{21}	—	August 24, 2000	Socorro	LINEAR	·	1.7 km	MPC · JPL
92639	2000 QX_{21}	—	August 24, 2000	Socorro	LINEAR	·	2.3 km	MPC · JPL
92640	2000 QL_{22}	—	August 25, 2000	Socorro	LINEAR	·	2.2 km	MPC · JPL
92641	2000 QM_{23}	—	August 25, 2000	Socorro	LINEAR	·	2.5 km	MPC · JPL
92642	2000 QQ_{23}	—	August 25, 2000	Socorro	LINEAR	V	1.7 km	MPC · JPL
92643	2000 QE_{24}	—	August 25, 2000	Socorro	LINEAR	·	2.5 km	MPC · JPL
92644	2000 QU_{26}	—	August 24, 2000	Socorro	LINEAR	·	2.3 km	MPC · JPL
92645	2000 QB_{29}	—	August 24, 2000	Socorro	LINEAR	NYS	2.3 km	MPC · JPL
92646	2000 QC_{31}	—	August 26, 2000	Socorro	LINEAR	V	1.5 km	MPC · JPL
92647	2000 QF_{31}	—	August 26, 2000	Socorro	LINEAR	·	4.7 km	MPC · JPL
92648	2000 QF_{35}	—	August 28, 2000	Reedy Creek	J. Broughton	·	3.0 km	MPC · JPL
92649	2000 QV_{35}	—	August 24, 2000	Socorro	LINEAR	·	2.4 km	MPC · JPL
92650	2000 QJ_{36}	—	August 24, 2000	Socorro	LINEAR	NYS	2.2 km	MPC · JPL
92651	2000 QQ_{36}	—	August 24, 2000	Socorro	LINEAR	·	2.5 km	MPC · JPL
92652	2000 QX_{36}	—	August 24, 2000	Socorro	LINEAR	·	2.9 km	MPC · JPL
92653	2000 QK_{37}	—	August 24, 2000	Socorro	LINEAR	MAS	1.5 km	MPC · JPL
92654	2000 QW_{37}	—	August 24, 2000	Socorro	LINEAR	NYS	2.7 km	MPC · JPL
92655	2000 QD_{38}	—	August 24, 2000	Socorro	LINEAR	NYS	2.3 km	MPC · JPL
92656	2000 QU_{39}	—	August 24, 2000	Socorro	LINEAR	V	1.4 km	MPC · JPL
92657	2000 QA_{40}	—	August 24, 2000	Socorro	LINEAR	·	3.4 km	MPC · JPL
92658	2000 QV_{40}	—	August 24, 2000	Socorro	LINEAR	·	2.6 km	MPC · JPL
92659	2000 QE_{43}	—	August 24, 2000	Socorro	LINEAR	·	2.0 km	MPC · JPL
92660	2000 QF_{43}	—	August 24, 2000	Socorro	LINEAR	NYS ·	2.7 km	MPC · JPL
92661	2000 QG_{43}	—	August 24, 2000	Socorro	LINEAR	·	2.1 km	MPC · JPL
92662	2000 QZ_{43}	—	August 24, 2000	Socorro	LINEAR	EUN · slow	2.1 km	MPC · JPL
92663	2000 QQ_{44}	—	August 24, 2000	Socorro	LINEAR	·	2.3 km	MPC · JPL
92664	2000 QB_{47}	—	August 24, 2000	Socorro	LINEAR	·	1.9 km	MPC · JPL
92665	2000 QD_{50}	—	August 24, 2000	Socorro	LINEAR	·	2.5 km	MPC · JPL
92666	2000 QO_{51}	—	August 24, 2000	Socorro	LINEAR	·	2.3 km	MPC · JPL
92667	2000 QT_{51}	—	August 24, 2000	Socorro	LINEAR	V	1.4 km	MPC · JPL
92668	2000 QB_{53}	—	August 24, 2000	Socorro	LINEAR	fast	2.2 km	MPC · JPL
92669	2000 QG_{54}	—	August 25, 2000	Socorro	LINEAR	·	2.3 km	MPC · JPL
92670	2000 QU_{55}	—	August 25, 2000	Socorro	LINEAR	·	2.2 km	MPC · JPL
92671	2000 QX_{55}	—	August 25, 2000	Socorro	LINEAR	·	3.2 km	MPC · JPL
92672	2000 QK_{56}	—	August 26, 2000	Socorro	LINEAR	·	2.2 km	MPC · JPL
92673	2000 QL_{56}	—	August 26, 2000	Socorro	LINEAR	·	2.0 km	MPC · JPL
92674	2000 QO_{57}	—	August 26, 2000	Socorro	LINEAR	·	1.4 km	MPC · JPL
92675	2000 QF_{61}	—	August 28, 2000	Socorro	LINEAR	NYS	2.3 km	MPC · JPL
92676	2000 QQ_{61}	—	August 28, 2000	Socorro	LINEAR	V	1.8 km	MPC · JPL
92677	2000 QW_{62}	—	August 28, 2000	Socorro	LINEAR	·	3.1 km	MPC · JPL
92678	2000 QB_{63}	—	August 28, 2000	Socorro	LINEAR	·	3.3 km	MPC · JPL
92679	2000 QS_{63}	—	August 28, 2000	Socorro	LINEAR	(5)	1.7 km	MPC · JPL
92680	2000 QG_{64}	—	August 28, 2000	Socorro	LINEAR	·	2.7 km	MPC · JPL
92681	2000 QK_{67}	—	August 28, 2000	Socorro	LINEAR	·	2.5 km	MPC · JPL
92682	2000 QT_{67}	—	August 28, 2000	Socorro	LINEAR	·	3.5 km	MPC · JPL
92683	2000 QZ_{67}	—	August 28, 2000	Socorro	LINEAR	·	2.3 km	MPC · JPL
92684	2000 QN_{69}	—	August 26, 2000	Kitt Peak	Spacewatch	·	3.2 km	MPC · JPL
92685 Cordellorenz	2000 QD_{71}	Cordellorenz	August 31, 2000	Cordell-Lorenz	D. T. Durig	·	2.6 km	MPC · JPL
92686	2000 QQ_{73}	—	August 24, 2000	Socorro	LINEAR	V	1.4 km	MPC · JPL
92687	2000 QD_{74}	—	August 24, 2000	Socorro	LINEAR	·	2.2 km	MPC · JPL
92688	2000 QE_{74}	—	August 24, 2000	Socorro	LINEAR	EUN	4.6 km	MPC · JPL
92689	2000 QK_{74}	—	August 24, 2000	Socorro	LINEAR	·	2.3 km	MPC · JPL
92690	2000 QN_{74}	—	August 24, 2000	Socorro	LINEAR	·	4.4 km	MPC · JPL
92691	2000 QD_{75}	—	August 24, 2000	Socorro	LINEAR	NYS	1.9 km	MPC · JPL
92692	2000 QJ_{75}	—	August 24, 2000	Socorro	LINEAR	MAS	1.4 km	MPC · JPL
92693	2000 QQ_{75}	—	August 24, 2000	Socorro	LINEAR	NYS	2.1 km	MPC · JPL
92694	2000 QO_{77}	—	August 24, 2000	Socorro	LINEAR	NYS	2.8 km	MPC · JPL
92695	2000 QB_{78}	—	August 24, 2000	Socorro	LINEAR	EUN	3.5 km	MPC · JPL
92696	2000 QJ_{78}	—	August 24, 2000	Socorro	LINEAR	·	3.0 km	MPC · JPL
92697	2000 QP_{78}	—	August 24, 2000	Socorro	LINEAR	NYS	1.8 km	MPC · JPL
92698	2000 QT_{78}	—	August 24, 2000	Socorro	LINEAR	·	3.6 km	MPC · JPL
92699	2000 QD_{80}	—	August 24, 2000	Socorro	LINEAR	·	2.3 km	MPC · JPL
92700	2000 QT_{81}	—	August 24, 2000	Socorro	LINEAR	·	1.9 km	MPC · JPL

== 92701–92800 ==
back to top

Designation			Discovery			Properties		Ref
Permanent	Provisional	Named after	Date	Site	Discoverer(s)	Category	Diam.	Ref
92701	2000 QC_{82}	—	August 24, 2000	Socorro	LINEAR	·	1.9 km	MPC · JPL
92702	2000 QT_{82}	—	August 24, 2000	Socorro	LINEAR	·	2.4 km	MPC · JPL
92703	2000 QE_{83}	—	August 24, 2000	Socorro	LINEAR	·	4.5 km	MPC · JPL
92704	2000 QK_{83}	—	August 24, 2000	Socorro	LINEAR	·	2.9 km	MPC · JPL
92705	2000 QY_{83}	—	August 24, 2000	Socorro	LINEAR	·	2.6 km	MPC · JPL
92706	2000 QL_{84}	—	August 25, 2000	Socorro	LINEAR	·	5.2 km	MPC · JPL
92707	2000 QM_{84}	—	August 25, 2000	Socorro	LINEAR	·	2.2 km	MPC · JPL
92708	2000 QB_{85}	—	August 25, 2000	Socorro	LINEAR	·	2.6 km	MPC · JPL
92709	2000 QP_{86}	—	August 25, 2000	Socorro	LINEAR	·	2.3 km	MPC · JPL
92710	2000 QL_{87}	—	August 25, 2000	Socorro	LINEAR	·	3.3 km	MPC · JPL
92711	2000 QP_{88}	—	August 25, 2000	Socorro	LINEAR	·	3.0 km	MPC · JPL
92712	2000 QQ_{88}	—	August 25, 2000	Socorro	LINEAR	·	2.5 km	MPC · JPL
92713	2000 QR_{88}	—	August 25, 2000	Socorro	LINEAR	·	2.5 km	MPC · JPL
92714	2000 QB_{89}	—	August 25, 2000	Socorro	LINEAR	·	3.1 km	MPC · JPL
92715	2000 QJ_{90}	—	August 25, 2000	Socorro	LINEAR	·	2.0 km	MPC · JPL
92716	2000 QP_{91}	—	August 25, 2000	Socorro	LINEAR	(5)	3.9 km	MPC · JPL
92717	2000 QU_{91}	—	August 25, 2000	Socorro	LINEAR	·	2.5 km	MPC · JPL
92718	2000 QG_{92}	—	August 25, 2000	Socorro	LINEAR	·	1.7 km	MPC · JPL
92719	2000 QX_{92}	—	August 25, 2000	Socorro	LINEAR	·	3.1 km	MPC · JPL
92720	2000 QH_{93}	—	August 25, 2000	Socorro	LINEAR	·	7.7 km	MPC · JPL
92721	2000 QX_{93}	—	August 26, 2000	Socorro	LINEAR	·	2.2 km	MPC · JPL
92722	2000 QY_{94}	—	August 26, 2000	Socorro	LINEAR	·	2.3 km	MPC · JPL
92723	2000 QH_{96}	—	August 28, 2000	Socorro	LINEAR	NYS	3.1 km	MPC · JPL
92724	2000 QZ_{96}	—	August 28, 2000	Socorro	LINEAR	EUN	3.7 km	MPC · JPL
92725	2000 QD_{97}	—	August 28, 2000	Socorro	LINEAR	·	2.7 km	MPC · JPL
92726	2000 QF_{97}	—	August 28, 2000	Socorro	LINEAR	·	4.2 km	MPC · JPL
92727	2000 QV_{97}	—	August 28, 2000	Socorro	LINEAR	·	3.0 km	MPC · JPL
92728	2000 QX_{98}	—	August 28, 2000	Socorro	LINEAR	·	3.3 km	MPC · JPL
92729	2000 QX_{99}	—	August 28, 2000	Socorro	LINEAR	·	3.4 km	MPC · JPL
92730	2000 QZ_{99}	—	August 28, 2000	Socorro	LINEAR	(5)	2.1 km	MPC · JPL
92731	2000 QM_{100}	—	August 28, 2000	Socorro	LINEAR	V	2.0 km	MPC · JPL
92732	2000 QP_{100}	—	August 28, 2000	Socorro	LINEAR	·	3.3 km	MPC · JPL
92733	2000 QB_{101}	—	August 28, 2000	Socorro	LINEAR	·	3.1 km	MPC · JPL
92734	2000 QE_{101}	—	August 28, 2000	Socorro	LINEAR	·	3.0 km	MPC · JPL
92735	2000 QJ_{101}	—	August 28, 2000	Socorro	LINEAR	PHO	1.8 km	MPC · JPL
92736	2000 QM_{102}	—	August 28, 2000	Socorro	LINEAR	(5)	3.4 km	MPC · JPL
92737	2000 QR_{102}	—	August 28, 2000	Socorro	LINEAR	·	3.3 km	MPC · JPL
92738	2000 QN_{104}	—	August 28, 2000	Socorro	LINEAR	PHO	5.0 km	MPC · JPL
92739	2000 QZ_{105}	—	August 28, 2000	Socorro	LINEAR	·	5.2 km	MPC · JPL
92740	2000 QK_{106}	—	August 29, 2000	Socorro	LINEAR	·	2.5 km	MPC · JPL
92741	2000 QN_{106}	—	August 29, 2000	Socorro	LINEAR	·	4.5 km	MPC · JPL
92742	2000 QC_{108}	—	August 29, 2000	Socorro	LINEAR	NYS	1.8 km	MPC · JPL
92743	2000 QP_{108}	—	August 29, 2000	Socorro	LINEAR	·	3.2 km	MPC · JPL
92744	2000 QV_{108}	—	August 29, 2000	Socorro	LINEAR	·	2.4 km	MPC · JPL
92745	2000 QW_{108}	—	August 29, 2000	Socorro	LINEAR	·	3.8 km	MPC · JPL
92746	2000 QK_{110}	—	August 24, 2000	Socorro	LINEAR	·	2.2 km	MPC · JPL
92747	2000 QQ_{110}	—	August 24, 2000	Socorro	LINEAR	NYS	3.4 km	MPC · JPL
92748	2000 QS_{111}	—	August 24, 2000	Socorro	LINEAR	·	2.0 km	MPC · JPL
92749	2000 QT_{111}	—	August 24, 2000	Socorro	LINEAR	·	2.6 km	MPC · JPL
92750	2000 QC_{112}	—	August 24, 2000	Socorro	LINEAR	NYS	4.5 km	MPC · JPL
92751	2000 QM_{112}	—	August 24, 2000	Socorro	LINEAR	·	2.5 km	MPC · JPL
92752	2000 QQ_{112}	—	August 24, 2000	Socorro	LINEAR	slow	2.8 km	MPC · JPL
92753	2000 QG_{113}	—	August 24, 2000	Socorro	LINEAR	·	2.7 km	MPC · JPL
92754	2000 QY_{113}	—	August 24, 2000	Socorro	LINEAR	NYS	1.9 km	MPC · JPL
92755	2000 QL_{115}	—	August 25, 2000	Socorro	LINEAR	·	1.9 km	MPC · JPL
92756	2000 QA_{116}	—	August 26, 2000	Socorro	LINEAR	·	2.5 km	MPC · JPL
92757	2000 QM_{118}	—	August 25, 2000	Socorro	LINEAR	·	2.6 km	MPC · JPL
92758	2000 QE_{120}	—	August 25, 2000	Socorro	LINEAR	·	3.6 km	MPC · JPL
92759	2000 QM_{120}	—	August 25, 2000	Socorro	LINEAR	(5)	2.3 km	MPC · JPL
92760	2000 QK_{121}	—	August 25, 2000	Socorro	LINEAR	·	3.0 km	MPC · JPL
92761	2000 QD_{122}	—	August 25, 2000	Socorro	LINEAR	·	3.4 km	MPC · JPL
92762	2000 QF_{123}	—	August 25, 2000	Socorro	LINEAR	·	2.5 km	MPC · JPL
92763	2000 QV_{123}	—	August 25, 2000	Socorro	LINEAR	·	3.2 km	MPC · JPL
92764	2000 QE_{125}	—	August 31, 2000	Socorro	LINEAR	·	2.4 km	MPC · JPL
92765	2000 QJ_{125}	—	August 31, 2000	Socorro	LINEAR	·	2.1 km	MPC · JPL
92766	2000 QM_{125}	—	August 31, 2000	Socorro	LINEAR	(5)	2.4 km	MPC · JPL
92767	2000 QF_{126}	—	August 31, 2000	Socorro	LINEAR	·	2.6 km	MPC · JPL
92768	2000 QT_{126}	—	August 31, 2000	Socorro	LINEAR	·	2.2 km	MPC · JPL
92769	2000 QZ_{126}	—	August 24, 2000	Socorro	LINEAR	·	2.4 km	MPC · JPL
92770	2000 QO_{129}	—	August 30, 2000	Višnjan Observatory	K. Korlević	MAS	1.2 km	MPC · JPL
92771	2000 QS_{132}	—	August 26, 2000	Socorro	LINEAR	·	3.2 km	MPC · JPL
92772	2000 QW_{132}	—	August 26, 2000	Socorro	LINEAR	·	4.5 km	MPC · JPL
92773	2000 QP_{133}	—	August 26, 2000	Socorro	LINEAR	MAS	1.4 km	MPC · JPL
92774	2000 QU_{133}	—	August 26, 2000	Socorro	LINEAR	·	3.6 km	MPC · JPL
92775	2000 QA_{134}	—	August 26, 2000	Socorro	LINEAR	MAS	2.1 km	MPC · JPL
92776	2000 QB_{134}	—	August 26, 2000	Socorro	LINEAR	·	2.5 km	MPC · JPL
92777	2000 QM_{134}	—	August 26, 2000	Socorro	LINEAR	·	2.4 km	MPC · JPL
92778	2000 QE_{135}	—	August 26, 2000	Socorro	LINEAR	HNS	3.0 km	MPC · JPL
92779	2000 QR_{135}	—	August 26, 2000	Socorro	LINEAR	·	3.0 km	MPC · JPL
92780	2000 QZ_{136}	—	August 29, 2000	Socorro	LINEAR	·	2.0 km	MPC · JPL
92781	2000 QA_{137}	—	August 29, 2000	Socorro	LINEAR	V	2.0 km	MPC · JPL
92782	2000 QJ_{138}	—	August 31, 2000	Socorro	LINEAR	·	2.8 km	MPC · JPL
92783	2000 QT_{140}	—	August 31, 2000	Socorro	LINEAR	·	2.4 km	MPC · JPL
92784	2000 QA_{141}	—	August 31, 2000	Socorro	LINEAR	EUN	2.8 km	MPC · JPL
92785	2000 QG_{143}	—	August 31, 2000	Socorro	LINEAR	·	1.8 km	MPC · JPL
92786	2000 QJ_{143}	—	August 31, 2000	Socorro	LINEAR	·	2.7 km	MPC · JPL
92787	2000 QE_{144}	—	August 31, 2000	Socorro	LINEAR	NYS	2.6 km	MPC · JPL
92788	2000 QO_{144}	—	August 31, 2000	Socorro	LINEAR	·	3.4 km	MPC · JPL
92789	2000 QF_{146}	—	August 31, 2000	Socorro	LINEAR	·	2.8 km	MPC · JPL
92790	2000 QE_{149}	—	August 24, 2000	Socorro	LINEAR	·	2.5 km	MPC · JPL
92791	2000 QX_{151}	—	August 26, 2000	Socorro	LINEAR	·	2.8 km	MPC · JPL
92792	2000 QB_{152}	—	August 26, 2000	Socorro	LINEAR	·	2.3 km	MPC · JPL
92793	2000 QD_{152}	—	August 28, 2000	Socorro	LINEAR	·	2.5 km	MPC · JPL
92794	2000 QP_{152}	—	August 29, 2000	Socorro	LINEAR	·	2.7 km	MPC · JPL
92795	2000 QA_{153}	—	August 29, 2000	Socorro	LINEAR	·	2.7 km	MPC · JPL
92796	2000 QC_{153}	—	August 29, 2000	Socorro	LINEAR	V	1.2 km	MPC · JPL
92797	2000 QF_{156}	—	August 31, 2000	Socorro	LINEAR	·	4.3 km	MPC · JPL
92798	2000 QP_{156}	—	August 31, 2000	Socorro	LINEAR	·	2.7 km	MPC · JPL
92799	2000 QX_{156}	—	August 31, 2000	Socorro	LINEAR	·	2.3 km	MPC · JPL
92800	2000 QK_{158}	—	August 31, 2000	Socorro	LINEAR	·	2.4 km	MPC · JPL

== 92801–92900 ==
back to top

Designation			Discovery			Properties		Ref
Permanent	Provisional	Named after	Date	Site	Discoverer(s)	Category	Diam.	Ref
92801	2000 QC_{159}	—	August 31, 2000	Socorro	LINEAR	·	2.4 km	MPC · JPL
92802	2000 QN_{161}	—	August 31, 2000	Socorro	LINEAR	·	2.5 km	MPC · JPL
92803	2000 QO_{161}	—	August 31, 2000	Socorro	LINEAR	·	2.5 km	MPC · JPL
92804	2000 QA_{163}	—	August 31, 2000	Socorro	LINEAR	V	4.2 km	MPC · JPL
92805	2000 QH_{163}	—	August 31, 2000	Socorro	LINEAR	·	3.1 km	MPC · JPL
92806	2000 QZ_{163}	—	August 31, 2000	Socorro	LINEAR	·	1.9 km	MPC · JPL
92807	2000 QK_{165}	—	August 31, 2000	Socorro	LINEAR	·	2.1 km	MPC · JPL
92808	2000 QE_{166}	—	August 31, 2000	Socorro	LINEAR	·	3.2 km	MPC · JPL
92809	2000 QM_{166}	—	August 31, 2000	Socorro	LINEAR	·	2.0 km	MPC · JPL
92810	2000 QN_{166}	—	August 31, 2000	Socorro	LINEAR	·	2.9 km	MPC · JPL
92811	2000 QF_{167}	—	August 31, 2000	Socorro	LINEAR	V	1.5 km	MPC · JPL
92812	2000 QY_{169}	—	August 31, 2000	Socorro	LINEAR	·	2.1 km	MPC · JPL
92813	2000 QO_{170}	—	August 31, 2000	Socorro	LINEAR	·	4.1 km	MPC · JPL
92814	2000 QZ_{171}	—	August 31, 2000	Socorro	LINEAR	PHO	3.2 km	MPC · JPL
92815	2000 QC_{172}	—	August 31, 2000	Socorro	LINEAR	·	2.6 km	MPC · JPL
92816	2000 QE_{173}	—	August 31, 2000	Socorro	LINEAR	·	2.8 km	MPC · JPL
92817	2000 QO_{173}	—	August 31, 2000	Socorro	LINEAR	V	1.6 km	MPC · JPL
92818	2000 QW_{174}	—	August 31, 2000	Socorro	LINEAR	·	3.1 km	MPC · JPL
92819	2000 QE_{175}	—	August 31, 2000	Socorro	LINEAR	·	3.8 km	MPC · JPL
92820	2000 QX_{175}	—	August 31, 2000	Socorro	LINEAR	·	1.9 km	MPC · JPL
92821	2000 QZ_{176}	—	August 31, 2000	Socorro	LINEAR	·	1.9 km	MPC · JPL
92822	2000 QD_{177}	—	August 31, 2000	Socorro	LINEAR	·	1.9 km	MPC · JPL
92823	2000 QM_{177}	—	August 31, 2000	Socorro	LINEAR	·	2.0 km	MPC · JPL
92824	2000 QP_{177}	—	August 31, 2000	Socorro	LINEAR	·	3.8 km	MPC · JPL
92825	2000 QQ_{177}	—	August 31, 2000	Socorro	LINEAR	·	4.4 km	MPC · JPL
92826	2000 QL_{179}	—	August 31, 2000	Socorro	LINEAR	PHO	1.7 km	MPC · JPL
92827	2000 QJ_{182}	—	August 31, 2000	Socorro	LINEAR	·	3.5 km	MPC · JPL
92828	2000 QQ_{182}	—	August 31, 2000	Socorro	LINEAR	·	5.3 km	MPC · JPL
92829	2000 QS_{182}	—	August 31, 2000	Socorro	LINEAR	·	2.5 km	MPC · JPL
92830	2000 QX_{182}	—	August 26, 2000	Socorro	LINEAR	·	3.4 km	MPC · JPL
92831	2000 QZ_{182}	—	August 31, 2000	Socorro	LINEAR	·	1.9 km	MPC · JPL
92832	2000 QQ_{183}	—	August 26, 2000	Socorro	LINEAR	·	2.2 km	MPC · JPL
92833	2000 QK_{184}	—	August 26, 2000	Socorro	LINEAR	·	2.8 km	MPC · JPL
92834	2000 QD_{185}	—	August 26, 2000	Socorro	LINEAR	·	4.0 km	MPC · JPL
92835	2000 QF_{185}	—	August 26, 2000	Socorro	LINEAR	·	3.1 km	MPC · JPL
92836	2000 QN_{187}	—	August 26, 2000	Socorro	LINEAR	·	3.0 km	MPC · JPL
92837	2000 QP_{187}	—	August 26, 2000	Socorro	LINEAR	·	1.9 km	MPC · JPL
92838	2000 QB_{188}	—	August 26, 2000	Socorro	LINEAR	NYS	2.3 km	MPC · JPL
92839	2000 QK_{189}	—	August 26, 2000	Socorro	LINEAR	·	2.7 km	MPC · JPL
92840	2000 QA_{190}	—	August 26, 2000	Socorro	LINEAR	·	2.7 km	MPC · JPL
92841	2000 QH_{190}	—	August 26, 2000	Socorro	LINEAR	·	3.0 km	MPC · JPL
92842	2000 QA_{194}	—	August 29, 2000	Socorro	LINEAR	·	2.9 km	MPC · JPL
92843	2000 QP_{194}	—	August 31, 2000	Socorro	LINEAR	·	4.8 km	MPC · JPL
92844	2000 QB_{195}	—	August 26, 2000	Socorro	LINEAR	(2076)	2.1 km	MPC · JPL
92845	2000 QJ_{195}	—	August 26, 2000	Socorro	LINEAR	·	3.6 km	MPC · JPL
92846	2000 QW_{195}	—	August 28, 2000	Socorro	LINEAR	·	3.4 km	MPC · JPL
92847	2000 QF_{196}	—	August 28, 2000	Socorro	LINEAR	·	2.0 km	MPC · JPL
92848	2000 QW_{197}	—	August 29, 2000	Socorro	LINEAR	NYS	1.9 km	MPC · JPL
92849	2000 QC_{198}	—	August 29, 2000	Socorro	LINEAR	·	2.2 km	MPC · JPL
92850	2000 QM_{198}	—	August 29, 2000	Socorro	LINEAR	NYS	2.4 km	MPC · JPL
92851	2000 QU_{199}	—	August 29, 2000	Socorro	LINEAR	·	4.5 km	MPC · JPL
92852	2000 QA_{200}	—	August 29, 2000	Socorro	LINEAR	·	2.7 km	MPC · JPL
92853	2000 QT_{202}	—	August 29, 2000	Socorro	LINEAR	·	2.6 km	MPC · JPL
92854	2000 QL_{204}	—	August 31, 2000	Socorro	LINEAR	·	3.6 km	MPC · JPL
92855	2000 QW_{204}	—	August 31, 2000	Socorro	LINEAR	NYS	1.6 km	MPC · JPL
92856	2000 QG_{205}	—	August 31, 2000	Socorro	LINEAR	·	2.7 km	MPC · JPL
92857	2000 QQ_{205}	—	August 31, 2000	Socorro	LINEAR	·	3.1 km	MPC · JPL
92858	2000 QV_{205}	—	August 31, 2000	Socorro	LINEAR	·	2.4 km	MPC · JPL
92859	2000 QE_{206}	—	August 31, 2000	Socorro	LINEAR	·	2.4 km	MPC · JPL
92860	2000 QP_{206}	—	August 31, 2000	Socorro	LINEAR	·	3.2 km	MPC · JPL
92861	2000 QS_{206}	—	August 31, 2000	Socorro	LINEAR	MAS	1.8 km	MPC · JPL
92862	2000 QP_{208}	—	August 31, 2000	Socorro	LINEAR	NYS	3.2 km	MPC · JPL
92863	2000 QQ_{208}	—	August 31, 2000	Socorro	LINEAR	·	2.5 km	MPC · JPL
92864	2000 QJ_{209}	—	August 31, 2000	Socorro	LINEAR	·	3.0 km	MPC · JPL
92865	2000 QH_{211}	—	August 31, 2000	Socorro	LINEAR	·	2.3 km	MPC · JPL
92866	2000 QD_{212}	—	August 31, 2000	Socorro	LINEAR	·	2.5 km	MPC · JPL
92867	2000 QU_{212}	—	August 31, 2000	Socorro	LINEAR	·	2.0 km	MPC · JPL
92868	2000 QB_{213}	—	August 31, 2000	Socorro	LINEAR	·	4.6 km	MPC · JPL
92869	2000 QP_{213}	—	August 31, 2000	Socorro	LINEAR	V	1.4 km	MPC · JPL
92870	2000 QH_{214}	—	August 31, 2000	Socorro	LINEAR	·	2.1 km	MPC · JPL
92871	2000 QK_{214}	—	August 31, 2000	Socorro	LINEAR	·	2.0 km	MPC · JPL
92872	2000 QN_{214}	—	August 31, 2000	Socorro	LINEAR	MAS	1.5 km	MPC · JPL
92873	2000 QW_{214}	—	August 31, 2000	Socorro	LINEAR	V	1.4 km	MPC · JPL
92874	2000 QT_{215}	—	August 31, 2000	Socorro	LINEAR	·	2.6 km	MPC · JPL
92875	2000 QZ_{216}	—	August 31, 2000	Socorro	LINEAR	(5)	2.5 km	MPC · JPL
92876	2000 QY_{217}	—	August 31, 2000	Socorro	LINEAR	GEF	4.8 km	MPC · JPL
92877	2000 QC_{218}	—	August 31, 2000	Socorro	LINEAR	KOR	4.5 km	MPC · JPL
92878	2000 QK_{218}	—	August 20, 2000	Anderson Mesa	LONEOS	·	1.6 km	MPC · JPL
92879	2000 QV_{218}	—	August 20, 2000	Anderson Mesa	LONEOS	·	2.4 km	MPC · JPL
92880	2000 QC_{219}	—	August 20, 2000	Anderson Mesa	LONEOS	NYS	1.7 km	MPC · JPL
92881	2000 QK_{219}	—	August 20, 2000	Anderson Mesa	LONEOS	·	1.9 km	MPC · JPL
92882	2000 QQ_{224}	—	August 26, 2000	Kitt Peak	Spacewatch	·	3.3 km	MPC · JPL
92883	2000 QZ_{224}	—	August 29, 2000	Socorro	LINEAR	NYS	2.4 km	MPC · JPL
92884	2000 QY_{225}	—	August 30, 2000	Kitt Peak	Spacewatch	·	2.2 km	MPC · JPL
92885	2000 QE_{228}	—	August 31, 2000	Socorro	LINEAR	·	2.1 km	MPC · JPL
92886	2000 QS_{229}	—	August 31, 2000	Socorro	LINEAR	MAS	1.4 km	MPC · JPL
92887	2000 QP_{230}	—	August 31, 2000	Socorro	LINEAR	·	2.1 km	MPC · JPL
92888	2000 QU_{230}	—	August 31, 2000	Socorro	LINEAR	ADE	3.8 km	MPC · JPL
92889	2000 QZ_{230}	—	August 31, 2000	Kitt Peak	Spacewatch	(5)	2.0 km	MPC · JPL
92890	2000 QB_{232}	—	August 30, 2000	Kitt Peak	Spacewatch	·	1.8 km	MPC · JPL
92891 Bless	2000 QK_{236}	Bless	August 26, 2000	Cerro Tololo	Millis, R.	V	1.6 km	MPC · JPL
92892 Robertlawrence	2000 QO_{244}	Robertlawrence	August 25, 2000	Cerro Tololo	M. W. Buie	·	2.4 km	MPC · JPL
92893 Michaelperson	2000 QE_{247}	Michaelperson	August 27, 2000	Cerro Tololo	Kern, S. D.	NYS	2.3 km	MPC · JPL
92894 Bluford	2000 QA_{248}	Bluford	August 28, 2000	Cerro Tololo	M. W. Buie	·	3.0 km	MPC · JPL
92895	2000 QU_{250}	—	August 21, 2000	Anderson Mesa	LONEOS	·	2.1 km	MPC · JPL
92896	2000 QW_{250}	—	August 21, 2000	Anderson Mesa	LONEOS	·	3.0 km	MPC · JPL
92897	2000 RV	—	September 1, 2000	Socorro	LINEAR	·	3.6 km	MPC · JPL
92898	2000 RS_{3}	—	September 1, 2000	Socorro	LINEAR	·	2.6 km	MPC · JPL
92899	2000 RW_{4}	—	September 1, 2000	Socorro	LINEAR	·	8.5 km	MPC · JPL
92900	2000 RZ_{4}	—	September 1, 2000	Socorro	LINEAR	·	3.3 km	MPC · JPL

== 92901–93000 ==
back to top

Designation			Discovery			Properties		Ref
Permanent	Provisional	Named after	Date	Site	Discoverer(s)	Category	Diam.	Ref
92901	2000 RE_{5}	—	September 1, 2000	Socorro	LINEAR	HNS	2.8 km	MPC · JPL
92902	2000 RF_{5}	—	September 1, 2000	Socorro	LINEAR	·	2.7 km	MPC · JPL
92903	2000 RO_{5}	—	September 1, 2000	Socorro	LINEAR	PHO	3.1 km	MPC · JPL
92904	2000 RO_{6}	—	September 1, 2000	Socorro	LINEAR	EUN	2.8 km	MPC · JPL
92905	2000 RT_{6}	—	September 1, 2000	Socorro	LINEAR	·	2.8 km	MPC · JPL
92906	2000 RW_{6}	—	September 1, 2000	Socorro	LINEAR	MAR	2.8 km	MPC · JPL
92907	2000 RK_{7}	—	September 1, 2000	Socorro	LINEAR	HNS	3.8 km	MPC · JPL
92908	2000 RO_{7}	—	September 1, 2000	Socorro	LINEAR	·	3.5 km	MPC · JPL
92909	2000 RV_{8}	—	September 1, 2000	Socorro	LINEAR	·	5.2 km	MPC · JPL
92910	2000 RJ_{10}	—	September 1, 2000	Socorro	LINEAR	·	2.9 km	MPC · JPL
92911	2000 RN_{10}	—	September 1, 2000	Socorro	LINEAR	·	5.7 km	MPC · JPL
92912	2000 RP_{10}	—	September 1, 2000	Socorro	LINEAR	·	3.0 km	MPC · JPL
92913	2000 RH_{11}	—	September 1, 2000	Socorro	LINEAR	(5)	2.6 km	MPC · JPL
92914	2000 RG_{13}	—	September 1, 2000	Socorro	LINEAR	·	2.0 km	MPC · JPL
92915	2000 RW_{13}	—	September 1, 2000	Socorro	LINEAR	ADE	6.3 km	MPC · JPL
92916	2000 RW_{14}	—	September 1, 2000	Socorro	LINEAR	·	2.7 km	MPC · JPL
92917	2000 RF_{15}	—	September 1, 2000	Socorro	LINEAR	·	2.3 km	MPC · JPL
92918	2000 RM_{17}	—	September 1, 2000	Socorro	LINEAR	·	2.4 km	MPC · JPL
92919	2000 RR_{17}	—	September 1, 2000	Socorro	LINEAR	·	2.7 km	MPC · JPL
92920	2000 RA_{19}	—	September 1, 2000	Socorro	LINEAR	·	2.8 km	MPC · JPL
92921	2000 RW_{19}	—	September 1, 2000	Socorro	LINEAR	·	4.0 km	MPC · JPL
92922	2000 RX_{20}	—	September 1, 2000	Socorro	LINEAR	·	2.7 km	MPC · JPL
92923	2000 RB_{21}	—	September 1, 2000	Socorro	LINEAR	·	2.1 km	MPC · JPL
92924	2000 RH_{21}	—	September 1, 2000	Socorro	LINEAR	V	1.8 km	MPC · JPL
92925	2000 RO_{22}	—	September 1, 2000	Socorro	LINEAR	·	4.0 km	MPC · JPL
92926	2000 RX_{22}	—	September 1, 2000	Socorro	LINEAR	·	2.1 km	MPC · JPL
92927	2000 RH_{23}	—	September 1, 2000	Socorro	LINEAR	·	2.7 km	MPC · JPL
92928	2000 RP_{23}	—	September 1, 2000	Socorro	LINEAR	·	3.4 km	MPC · JPL
92929	2000 RN_{25}	—	September 1, 2000	Socorro	LINEAR	V	1.7 km	MPC · JPL
92930	2000 RH_{26}	—	September 1, 2000	Socorro	LINEAR	·	4.5 km	MPC · JPL
92931	2000 RM_{26}	—	September 1, 2000	Socorro	LINEAR	EUN	2.3 km	MPC · JPL
92932	2000 RO_{27}	—	September 1, 2000	Socorro	LINEAR	·	5.4 km	MPC · JPL
92933	2000 RS_{29}	—	September 1, 2000	Socorro	LINEAR	·	2.4 km	MPC · JPL
92934	2000 RV_{29}	—	September 1, 2000	Socorro	LINEAR	·	5.3 km	MPC · JPL
92935	2000 RX_{31}	—	September 1, 2000	Socorro	LINEAR	·	2.6 km	MPC · JPL
92936	2000 RQ_{32}	—	September 1, 2000	Socorro	LINEAR	·	2.9 km	MPC · JPL
92937	2000 RZ_{32}	—	September 1, 2000	Socorro	LINEAR	·	3.1 km	MPC · JPL
92938	2000 RA_{33}	—	September 1, 2000	Socorro	LINEAR	HNS · slow	2.9 km	MPC · JPL
92939	2000 RC_{33}	—	September 1, 2000	Socorro	LINEAR	EUN	3.5 km	MPC · JPL
92940	2000 RX_{33}	—	September 1, 2000	Socorro	LINEAR	EUN	3.1 km	MPC · JPL
92941	2000 RP_{34}	—	September 1, 2000	Socorro	LINEAR	·	5.3 km	MPC · JPL
92942	2000 RC_{35}	—	September 1, 2000	Socorro	LINEAR	EUN	3.4 km	MPC · JPL
92943	2000 RD_{38}	—	September 5, 2000	Kvistaberg	Uppsala-DLR Asteroid Survey	·	4.4 km	MPC · JPL
92944	2000 RK_{38}	—	September 5, 2000	Kvistaberg	Uppsala-DLR Asteroid Survey	·	2.0 km	MPC · JPL
92945	2000 RQ_{39}	—	September 1, 2000	Socorro	LINEAR	MAR	3.3 km	MPC · JPL
92946	2000 RC_{40}	—	September 3, 2000	Socorro	LINEAR	·	2.9 km	MPC · JPL
92947	2000 RO_{41}	—	September 3, 2000	Socorro	LINEAR	·	6.0 km	MPC · JPL
92948	2000 RQ_{41}	—	September 3, 2000	Socorro	LINEAR	·	5.2 km	MPC · JPL
92949	2000 RS_{41}	—	September 3, 2000	Socorro	LINEAR	·	4.5 km	MPC · JPL
92950	2000 RD_{42}	—	September 3, 2000	Socorro	LINEAR	·	3.3 km	MPC · JPL
92951	2000 RG_{42}	—	September 3, 2000	Socorro	LINEAR	·	7.0 km	MPC · JPL
92952	2000 RU_{42}	—	September 3, 2000	Socorro	LINEAR	·	3.9 km	MPC · JPL
92953	2000 RL_{43}	—	September 3, 2000	Socorro	LINEAR	(1547)	2.1 km	MPC · JPL
92954	2000 RG_{44}	—	September 3, 2000	Socorro	LINEAR	·	2.4 km	MPC · JPL
92955	2000 RK_{44}	—	September 3, 2000	Socorro	LINEAR	·	3.9 km	MPC · JPL
92956	2000 RC_{45}	—	September 3, 2000	Socorro	LINEAR	·	5.9 km	MPC · JPL
92957	2000 RD_{45}	—	September 3, 2000	Socorro	LINEAR	·	4.8 km	MPC · JPL
92958	2000 RP_{46}	—	September 3, 2000	Socorro	LINEAR	·	3.3 km	MPC · JPL
92959	2000 RA_{47}	—	September 3, 2000	Socorro	LINEAR	·	5.2 km	MPC · JPL
92960	2000 RE_{47}	—	September 3, 2000	Socorro	LINEAR	·	3.0 km	MPC · JPL
92961	2000 RM_{47}	—	September 3, 2000	Socorro	LINEAR	EUN	3.4 km	MPC · JPL
92962	2000 RD_{48}	—	September 3, 2000	Socorro	LINEAR	·	2.9 km	MPC · JPL
92963	2000 RN_{48}	—	September 3, 2000	Socorro	LINEAR	·	6.7 km	MPC · JPL
92964	2000 RR_{48}	—	September 3, 2000	Socorro	LINEAR	·	4.0 km	MPC · JPL
92965	2000 RQ_{49}	—	September 5, 2000	Socorro	LINEAR	EUN	4.8 km	MPC · JPL
92966	2000 RK_{50}	—	September 5, 2000	Socorro	LINEAR	·	3.9 km	MPC · JPL
92967	2000 RW_{50}	—	September 5, 2000	Socorro	LINEAR	EUN	3.9 km	MPC · JPL
92968	2000 RA_{52}	—	September 5, 2000	Socorro	LINEAR	EOS	4.8 km	MPC · JPL
92969	2000 RG_{55}	—	September 3, 2000	Socorro	LINEAR	EUN	3.1 km	MPC · JPL
92970	2000 RY_{55}	—	September 5, 2000	Socorro	LINEAR	NYS	2.2 km	MPC · JPL
92971	2000 RR_{56}	—	September 6, 2000	Socorro	LINEAR	·	3.9 km	MPC · JPL
92972	2000 RZ_{59}	—	September 5, 2000	Višnjan Observatory	K. Korlević	·	3.0 km	MPC · JPL
92973	2000 RN_{60}	—	September 3, 2000	Socorro	LINEAR	·	5.3 km	MPC · JPL
92974	2000 RM_{61}	—	September 1, 2000	Socorro	LINEAR	EUN	2.6 km	MPC · JPL
92975	2000 RC_{65}	—	September 1, 2000	Socorro	LINEAR	·	3.9 km	MPC · JPL
92976	2000 RP_{65}	—	September 1, 2000	Socorro	LINEAR	EUN	2.6 km	MPC · JPL
92977	2000 RW_{67}	—	September 1, 2000	Socorro	LINEAR	EUN	3.3 km	MPC · JPL
92978	2000 RB_{68}	—	September 2, 2000	Socorro	LINEAR	·	3.7 km	MPC · JPL
92979	2000 RS_{68}	—	September 2, 2000	Socorro	LINEAR	·	7.5 km	MPC · JPL
92980	2000 RG_{69}	—	September 2, 2000	Socorro	LINEAR	·	2.8 km	MPC · JPL
92981	2000 RH_{69}	—	September 2, 2000	Socorro	LINEAR	·	4.3 km	MPC · JPL
92982	2000 RE_{71}	—	September 2, 2000	Socorro	LINEAR	·	2.9 km	MPC · JPL
92983	2000 RB_{72}	—	September 2, 2000	Socorro	LINEAR	·	2.2 km	MPC · JPL
92984	2000 RS_{72}	—	September 2, 2000	Socorro	LINEAR	(5)	2.7 km	MPC · JPL
92985	2000 RY_{72}	—	September 2, 2000	Socorro	LINEAR	·	2.1 km	MPC · JPL
92986	2000 RZ_{72}	—	September 2, 2000	Socorro	LINEAR	NYS	3.0 km	MPC · JPL
92987	2000 RB_{73}	—	September 2, 2000	Socorro	LINEAR	·	4.4 km	MPC · JPL
92988	2000 RJ_{73}	—	September 2, 2000	Socorro	LINEAR	·	2.0 km	MPC · JPL
92989	2000 RR_{73}	—	September 2, 2000	Socorro	LINEAR	·	3.8 km	MPC · JPL
92990	2000 RA_{74}	—	September 2, 2000	Socorro	LINEAR	·	4.1 km	MPC · JPL
92991	2000 RB_{75}	—	September 3, 2000	Socorro	LINEAR	·	3.8 km	MPC · JPL
92992	2000 RP_{75}	—	September 3, 2000	Socorro	LINEAR	·	2.6 km	MPC · JPL
92993	2000 RA_{76}	—	September 3, 2000	Socorro	LINEAR	EUN	5.1 km	MPC · JPL
92994	2000 RB_{76}	—	September 3, 2000	Socorro	LINEAR	·	3.3 km	MPC · JPL
92995	2000 RZ_{77}	—	September 2, 2000	Anderson Mesa	LONEOS	·	2.4 km	MPC · JPL
92996	2000 RE_{78}	—	September 9, 2000	Črni Vrh	Matičič, S.	·	3.4 km	MPC · JPL
92997	2000 RH_{78}	—	September 9, 2000	Desert Beaver	W. K. Y. Yeung	·	3.8 km	MPC · JPL
92998	2000 RL_{81}	—	September 1, 2000	Socorro	LINEAR	·	2.4 km	MPC · JPL
92999	2000 RL_{82}	—	September 1, 2000	Socorro	LINEAR	·	3.2 km	MPC · JPL
93000	2000 RJ_{83}	—	September 1, 2000	Socorro	LINEAR	·	2.8 km	MPC · JPL

back to top

== See also ==
- Meanings of minor-planet names: 92001–93000
