= List of minor planets: 93001–94000 =

The following is a partial list of minor planets, running from minor-planet number 93001 through 94000, inclusive. The primary data for this and other partial lists is based on JPL's "Small-Body Orbital Elements" and data available from the Minor Planet Center. Critical list information is also provided by the MPC, unless otherwise specified from Lowell Observatory. A detailed description of the table's columns and additional sources are given on the main page including a complete list of every page in this series, and a statistical break-up on the dynamical classification of minor planets.

Also see the summary list of all named bodies in numerical and alphabetical order, and the corresponding naming citations for the number range of this particular list. New namings may only be added to this list after official publication, as the preannouncement of names is condemned by the Working Group for Small Bodies Nomenclature of the International Astronomical Union.

Near-Earth obj.	MBA (inner)	MBA (outer)	Centaur
Mars-crosser	MBA (middle)	Jupiter trojan	Trans-Neptunian obj.
Unclassified

== 93001–93100 ==
Designation			Discovery			Properties		Ref
Permanent	Provisional	Named after	Date	Site	Discoverer(s)	Category	Diam.	Ref
93001	2000 RD_{84}	—	September 2, 2000	Anderson Mesa	LONEOS	V	1.4 km	MPC · JPL
93002	2000 RN_{85}	—	September 2, 2000	Anderson Mesa	LONEOS	NYS	1.7 km	MPC · JPL
93003	2000 RY_{85}	—	September 2, 2000	Socorro	LINEAR	·	4.5 km	MPC · JPL
93004	2000 RB_{86}	—	September 2, 2000	Socorro	LINEAR	EUN	4.0 km	MPC · JPL
93005	2000 RG_{86}	—	September 2, 2000	Socorro	LINEAR	·	2.3 km	MPC · JPL
93006	2000 RH_{86}	—	September 2, 2000	Socorro	LINEAR	·	2.3 km	MPC · JPL
93007	2000 RN_{86}	—	September 2, 2000	Anderson Mesa	LONEOS	RAF	2.9 km	MPC · JPL
93008	2000 RR_{86}	—	September 2, 2000	Anderson Mesa	LONEOS	JUN	3.0 km	MPC · JPL
93009	2000 RA_{87}	—	September 2, 2000	Anderson Mesa	LONEOS	NYS	2.3 km	MPC · JPL
93010	2000 RD_{87}	—	September 2, 2000	Anderson Mesa	LONEOS	·	2.5 km	MPC · JPL
93011	2000 RL_{87}	—	September 2, 2000	Anderson Mesa	LONEOS	·	1.7 km	MPC · JPL
93012	2000 RZ_{87}	—	September 2, 2000	Anderson Mesa	LONEOS	V	1.9 km	MPC · JPL
93013	2000 RG_{89}	—	September 3, 2000	Socorro	LINEAR	MAR	2.2 km	MPC · JPL
93014	2000 RY_{90}	—	September 3, 2000	Socorro	LINEAR	EUN	2.3 km	MPC · JPL
93015	2000 RY_{91}	—	September 3, 2000	Socorro	LINEAR	·	2.5 km	MPC · JPL
93016	2000 RA_{92}	—	September 3, 2000	Socorro	LINEAR	·	2.6 km	MPC · JPL
93017	2000 RK_{92}	—	September 3, 2000	Socorro	LINEAR	EUN	2.5 km	MPC · JPL
93018	2000 RT_{92}	—	September 3, 2000	Socorro	LINEAR	·	3.1 km	MPC · JPL
93019	2000 RE_{94}	—	September 4, 2000	Anderson Mesa	LONEOS	·	2.2 km	MPC · JPL
93020	2000 RY_{94}	—	September 4, 2000	Anderson Mesa	LONEOS	·	3.7 km	MPC · JPL
93021	2000 RG_{95}	—	September 4, 2000	Anderson Mesa	LONEOS	·	2.9 km	MPC · JPL
93022	2000 RM_{95}	—	September 4, 2000	Anderson Mesa	LONEOS	·	1.9 km	MPC · JPL
93023	2000 RP_{95}	—	September 4, 2000	Anderson Mesa	LONEOS	NYS	4.8 km	MPC · JPL
93024	2000 RX_{95}	—	September 4, 2000	Anderson Mesa	LONEOS	·	2.7 km	MPC · JPL
93025	2000 RD_{96}	—	September 4, 2000	Anderson Mesa	LONEOS	·	2.3 km	MPC · JPL
93026	2000 RT_{96}	—	September 4, 2000	Haleakala	NEAT	·	3.4 km	MPC · JPL
93027	2000 RA_{97}	—	September 5, 2000	Anderson Mesa	LONEOS	·	2.2 km	MPC · JPL
93028	2000 RF_{98}	—	September 5, 2000	Anderson Mesa	LONEOS	·	6.7 km	MPC · JPL
93029	2000 RU_{98}	—	September 5, 2000	Anderson Mesa	LONEOS	EUN	2.3 km	MPC · JPL
93030	2000 RC_{99}	—	September 5, 2000	Anderson Mesa	LONEOS	·	3.1 km	MPC · JPL
93031	2000 RH_{100}	—	September 5, 2000	Socorro	LINEAR	·	4.0 km	MPC · JPL
93032	2000 RG_{101}	—	September 5, 2000	Anderson Mesa	LONEOS	·	3.5 km	MPC · JPL
93033	2000 RK_{102}	—	September 5, 2000	Anderson Mesa	LONEOS	EUN	2.2 km	MPC · JPL
93034	2000 RN_{102}	—	September 5, 2000	Anderson Mesa	LONEOS	HNS	3.0 km	MPC · JPL
93035	2000 RR_{103}	—	September 6, 2000	Socorro	LINEAR	·	2.9 km	MPC · JPL
93036	2000 RW_{103}	—	September 6, 2000	Socorro	LINEAR	·	3.6 km	MPC · JPL
93037	2000 RF_{104}	—	September 6, 2000	Socorro	LINEAR	EUN	3.2 km	MPC · JPL
93038	2000 RL_{104}	—	September 6, 2000	Socorro	LINEAR	·	3.3 km	MPC · JPL
93039	2000 RL_{106}	—	September 6, 2000	Socorro	LINEAR	·	4.1 km	MPC · JPL
93040	2000 SG	—	September 18, 2000	Socorro	LINEAR	·	3.8 km	MPC · JPL
93041	2000 SU_{2}	—	September 20, 2000	Haleakala	NEAT	PHO	2.5 km	MPC · JPL
93042	2000 SD_{4}	—	September 21, 2000	Haleakala	NEAT	NYS	3.2 km	MPC · JPL
93043	2000 SF_{4}	—	September 21, 2000	Haleakala	NEAT	·	3.2 km	MPC · JPL
93044	2000 SE_{6}	—	September 20, 2000	Socorro	LINEAR	·	2.2 km	MPC · JPL
93045	2000 SF_{6}	—	September 20, 2000	Socorro	LINEAR	EUN	2.9 km	MPC · JPL
93046	2000 SM_{6}	—	September 20, 2000	Socorro	LINEAR	·	2.9 km	MPC · JPL
93047	2000 ST_{6}	—	September 21, 2000	Socorro	LINEAR	V	1.6 km	MPC · JPL
93048	2000 SB_{7}	—	September 22, 2000	Reedy Creek	R. H. McNaught	PHO	2.6 km	MPC · JPL
93049	2000 SL_{8}	—	September 19, 2000	Haleakala	NEAT	·	2.3 km	MPC · JPL
93050	2000 SM_{8}	—	September 19, 2000	Haleakala	NEAT	·	2.0 km	MPC · JPL
93051	2000 SP_{8}	—	September 22, 2000	Prescott	P. G. Comba	·	2.4 km	MPC · JPL
93052	2000 SH_{9}	—	September 23, 2000	Socorro	LINEAR	BAR	3.9 km	MPC · JPL
93053	2000 SR_{12}	—	September 20, 2000	Socorro	LINEAR	·	2.0 km	MPC · JPL
93054	2000 SW_{12}	—	September 21, 2000	Socorro	LINEAR	·	1.9 km	MPC · JPL
93055	2000 SY_{12}	—	September 21, 2000	Socorro	LINEAR	·	2.4 km	MPC · JPL
93056	2000 SC_{13}	—	September 21, 2000	Socorro	LINEAR	EUN	1.9 km	MPC · JPL
93057	2000 SE_{14}	—	September 23, 2000	Socorro	LINEAR	·	3.1 km	MPC · JPL
93058	2000 SL_{14}	—	September 23, 2000	Socorro	LINEAR	·	4.3 km	MPC · JPL
93059	2000 SO_{16}	—	September 23, 2000	Socorro	LINEAR	·	2.9 km	MPC · JPL
93060	2000 SW_{20}	—	September 21, 2000	Haleakala	NEAT	·	3.5 km	MPC · JPL
93061 Barbagallo	2000 SX_{20}	Barbagallo	September 23, 2000	Bologna	San Vittore	·	3.0 km	MPC · JPL
93062	2000 SF_{22}	—	September 19, 2000	Haleakala	NEAT	·	2.4 km	MPC · JPL
93063	2000 SJ_{22}	—	September 20, 2000	Haleakala	NEAT	·	2.3 km	MPC · JPL
93064	2000 SN_{22}	—	September 20, 2000	Haleakala	NEAT	(5)	2.1 km	MPC · JPL
93065	2000 ST_{22}	—	September 20, 2000	Haleakala	NEAT	·	2.1 km	MPC · JPL
93066	2000 SU_{22}	—	September 20, 2000	Haleakala	NEAT	·	2.8 km	MPC · JPL
93067	2000 SB_{23}	—	September 25, 2000	Višnjan Observatory	K. Korlević	·	3.0 km	MPC · JPL
93068	2000 SR_{24}	—	September 26, 2000	Bisei SG Center	BATTeRS	·	7.5 km	MPC · JPL
93069	2000 SX_{24}	—	September 26, 2000	Bisei SG Center	BATTeRS	·	2.5 km	MPC · JPL
93070	2000 SE_{25}	—	September 22, 2000	Socorro	LINEAR	PHO	4.2 km	MPC · JPL
93071	2000 SD_{26}	—	September 23, 2000	Socorro	LINEAR	·	2.8 km	MPC · JPL
93072	2000 SU_{26}	—	September 23, 2000	Socorro	LINEAR	·	1.8 km	MPC · JPL
93073	2000 SO_{27}	—	September 23, 2000	Socorro	LINEAR	·	2.2 km	MPC · JPL
93074	2000 SR_{27}	—	September 23, 2000	Socorro	LINEAR	V	1.3 km	MPC · JPL
93075	2000 SE_{28}	—	September 23, 2000	Socorro	LINEAR	·	7.2 km	MPC · JPL
93076	2000 SF_{28}	—	September 23, 2000	Socorro	LINEAR	·	2.6 km	MPC · JPL
93077	2000 SM_{28}	—	September 23, 2000	Socorro	LINEAR	ADE	5.1 km	MPC · JPL
93078	2000 SW_{28}	—	September 23, 2000	Socorro	LINEAR	·	3.0 km	MPC · JPL
93079	2000 SX_{28}	—	September 23, 2000	Socorro	LINEAR	·	3.0 km	MPC · JPL
93080	2000 SK_{29}	—	September 24, 2000	Socorro	LINEAR	·	2.3 km	MPC · JPL
93081	2000 SP_{29}	—	September 24, 2000	Socorro	LINEAR	·	2.1 km	MPC · JPL
93082	2000 SL_{32}	—	September 24, 2000	Socorro	LINEAR	·	2.5 km	MPC · JPL
93083	2000 SC_{33}	—	September 24, 2000	Socorro	LINEAR	·	2.1 km	MPC · JPL
93084	2000 SD_{34}	—	September 24, 2000	Socorro	LINEAR	·	4.8 km	MPC · JPL
93085	2000 SE_{35}	—	September 24, 2000	Socorro	LINEAR	·	2.2 km	MPC · JPL
93086	2000 SU_{35}	—	September 24, 2000	Socorro	LINEAR	(5)	2.2 km	MPC · JPL
93087	2000 SK_{36}	—	September 24, 2000	Socorro	LINEAR	·	3.8 km	MPC · JPL
93088	2000 SO_{36}	—	September 24, 2000	Socorro	LINEAR	·	3.7 km	MPC · JPL
93089	2000 SX_{36}	—	September 24, 2000	Socorro	LINEAR	·	2.2 km	MPC · JPL
93090	2000 SF_{37}	—	September 24, 2000	Socorro	LINEAR	·	1.9 km	MPC · JPL
93091	2000 SG_{38}	—	September 24, 2000	Socorro	LINEAR	·	2.6 km	MPC · JPL
93092	2000 SN_{38}	—	September 24, 2000	Socorro	LINEAR	NYS	2.0 km	MPC · JPL
93093	2000 SB_{39}	—	September 24, 2000	Socorro	LINEAR	·	3.6 km	MPC · JPL
93094	2000 SF_{39}	—	September 24, 2000	Socorro	LINEAR	V	2.9 km	MPC · JPL
93095	2000 SL_{39}	—	September 24, 2000	Socorro	LINEAR	·	2.3 km	MPC · JPL
93096	2000 SN_{39}	—	September 24, 2000	Socorro	LINEAR	·	2.7 km	MPC · JPL
93097	2000 SP_{39}	—	September 24, 2000	Socorro	LINEAR	·	2.8 km	MPC · JPL
93098	2000 ST_{39}	—	September 24, 2000	Socorro	LINEAR	·	2.1 km	MPC · JPL
93099	2000 SY_{39}	—	September 24, 2000	Socorro	LINEAR	·	2.4 km	MPC · JPL
93100	2000 SV_{41}	—	September 24, 2000	Socorro	LINEAR	·	3.2 km	MPC · JPL

== 93101–93200 ==
back to top

Designation			Discovery			Properties		Ref
Permanent	Provisional	Named after	Date	Site	Discoverer(s)	Category	Diam.	Ref
93101	2000 SU_{42}	—	September 26, 2000	Bisei SG Center	BATTeRS	·	3.9 km	MPC · JPL
93102 Leroy	2000 ST_{43}	Leroy	September 27, 2000	Sainte-Clotilde	Chassagne, R., C. Demeautis	V	1.9 km	MPC · JPL
93103	2000 SA_{44}	—	September 23, 2000	Socorro	LINEAR	HNS	2.2 km	MPC · JPL
93104	2000 SK_{45}	—	September 22, 2000	Socorro	LINEAR	·	4.0 km	MPC · JPL
93105	2000 SB_{47}	—	September 23, 2000	Socorro	LINEAR	·	2.8 km	MPC · JPL
93106	2000 ST_{47}	—	September 23, 2000	Socorro	LINEAR	·	5.7 km	MPC · JPL
93107	2000 SA_{49}	—	September 23, 2000	Socorro	LINEAR	·	1.9 km	MPC · JPL
93108	2000 SA_{50}	—	September 23, 2000	Socorro	LINEAR	·	2.1 km	MPC · JPL
93109	2000 SN_{52}	—	September 23, 2000	Socorro	LINEAR	HNS	3.5 km	MPC · JPL
93110	2000 SA_{54}	—	September 24, 2000	Socorro	LINEAR	(5)	2.0 km	MPC · JPL
93111	2000 SJ_{55}	—	September 24, 2000	Socorro	LINEAR	·	3.3 km	MPC · JPL
93112	2000 SP_{56}	—	September 24, 2000	Socorro	LINEAR	·	2.8 km	MPC · JPL
93113	2000 SZ_{56}	—	September 24, 2000	Socorro	LINEAR	·	3.0 km	MPC · JPL
93114	2000 SE_{58}	—	September 24, 2000	Socorro	LINEAR	·	2.4 km	MPC · JPL
93115	2000 SJ_{58}	—	September 24, 2000	Socorro	LINEAR	·	2.5 km	MPC · JPL
93116	2000 SL_{58}	—	September 24, 2000	Socorro	LINEAR	·	4.3 km	MPC · JPL
93117	2000 SM_{58}	—	September 24, 2000	Socorro	LINEAR	·	2.3 km	MPC · JPL
93118	2000 SY_{58}	—	September 24, 2000	Socorro	LINEAR	NYS	2.8 km	MPC · JPL
93119	2000 SJ_{59}	—	September 24, 2000	Socorro	LINEAR	·	2.2 km	MPC · JPL
93120	2000 SK_{59}	—	September 24, 2000	Socorro	LINEAR	·	3.4 km	MPC · JPL
93121	2000 SY_{59}	—	September 24, 2000	Socorro	LINEAR	·	4.0 km	MPC · JPL
93122	2000 SB_{61}	—	September 24, 2000	Socorro	LINEAR	·	2.5 km	MPC · JPL
93123	2000 SK_{61}	—	September 24, 2000	Socorro	LINEAR	·	3.3 km	MPC · JPL
93124	2000 SU_{61}	—	September 24, 2000	Socorro	LINEAR	MAS	2.2 km	MPC · JPL
93125	2000 SJ_{62}	—	September 24, 2000	Socorro	LINEAR	·	2.6 km	MPC · JPL
93126	2000 SY_{62}	—	September 24, 2000	Socorro	LINEAR	·	2.2 km	MPC · JPL
93127	2000 SW_{63}	—	September 24, 2000	Socorro	LINEAR	·	1.6 km	MPC · JPL
93128	2000 SN_{64}	—	September 24, 2000	Socorro	LINEAR	(5)	2.4 km	MPC · JPL
93129	2000 ST_{65}	—	September 24, 2000	Socorro	LINEAR	NYS	3.0 km	MPC · JPL
93130	2000 SZ_{65}	—	September 24, 2000	Socorro	LINEAR	·	2.7 km	MPC · JPL
93131	2000 SV_{67}	—	September 24, 2000	Socorro	LINEAR	·	2.3 km	MPC · JPL
93132	2000 SJ_{69}	—	September 24, 2000	Socorro	LINEAR	·	2.9 km	MPC · JPL
93133	2000 SS_{69}	—	September 24, 2000	Socorro	LINEAR	·	3.2 km	MPC · JPL
93134	2000 SB_{70}	—	September 24, 2000	Socorro	LINEAR	·	2.7 km	MPC · JPL
93135	2000 SX_{70}	—	September 24, 2000	Socorro	LINEAR	(5)	2.7 km	MPC · JPL
93136	2000 SZ_{70}	—	September 24, 2000	Socorro	LINEAR	(5)	2.4 km	MPC · JPL
93137	2000 SC_{71}	—	September 24, 2000	Socorro	LINEAR	·	4.2 km	MPC · JPL
93138	2000 SK_{71}	—	September 24, 2000	Socorro	LINEAR	·	2.2 km	MPC · JPL
93139	2000 SZ_{71}	—	September 24, 2000	Socorro	LINEAR	EUN	2.4 km	MPC · JPL
93140	2000 SC_{72}	—	September 24, 2000	Socorro	LINEAR	·	2.1 km	MPC · JPL
93141	2000 SY_{72}	—	September 24, 2000	Socorro	LINEAR	·	2.1 km	MPC · JPL
93142	2000 SE_{73}	—	September 24, 2000	Socorro	LINEAR	·	2.6 km	MPC · JPL
93143	2000 SE_{75}	—	September 24, 2000	Socorro	LINEAR	(5)	2.2 km	MPC · JPL
93144	2000 SM_{78}	—	September 24, 2000	Socorro	LINEAR	·	2.9 km	MPC · JPL
93145	2000 SS_{78}	—	September 24, 2000	Socorro	LINEAR	·	1.8 km	MPC · JPL
93146	2000 SU_{78}	—	September 24, 2000	Socorro	LINEAR	·	2.2 km	MPC · JPL
93147	2000 SA_{80}	—	September 24, 2000	Socorro	LINEAR	·	4.6 km	MPC · JPL
93148	2000 SC_{80}	—	September 24, 2000	Socorro	LINEAR	·	2.8 km	MPC · JPL
93149	2000 SM_{80}	—	September 24, 2000	Socorro	LINEAR	·	1.6 km	MPC · JPL
93150	2000 SC_{81}	—	September 24, 2000	Socorro	LINEAR	·	2.5 km	MPC · JPL
93151	2000 SD_{82}	—	September 24, 2000	Socorro	LINEAR	·	2.6 km	MPC · JPL
93152	2000 ST_{83}	—	September 24, 2000	Socorro	LINEAR	·	2.8 km	MPC · JPL
93153	2000 SF_{84}	—	September 24, 2000	Socorro	LINEAR	·	2.6 km	MPC · JPL
93154	2000 SK_{84}	—	September 24, 2000	Socorro	LINEAR	·	4.5 km	MPC · JPL
93155	2000 SX_{84}	—	September 24, 2000	Socorro	LINEAR	(5)	2.3 km	MPC · JPL
93156	2000 SB_{85}	—	September 24, 2000	Socorro	LINEAR	·	6.0 km	MPC · JPL
93157	2000 SD_{85}	—	September 24, 2000	Socorro	LINEAR	(5)	3.8 km	MPC · JPL
93158	2000 SK_{85}	—	September 24, 2000	Socorro	LINEAR	·	2.9 km	MPC · JPL
93159	2000 SZ_{86}	—	September 24, 2000	Socorro	LINEAR	·	3.7 km	MPC · JPL
93160	2000 SU_{87}	—	September 24, 2000	Socorro	LINEAR	·	1.7 km	MPC · JPL
93161	2000 SX_{87}	—	September 24, 2000	Socorro	LINEAR	·	2.8 km	MPC · JPL
93162	2000 SJ_{88}	—	September 24, 2000	Socorro	LINEAR	EUN	3.6 km	MPC · JPL
93163	2000 SC_{89}	—	September 25, 2000	Socorro	LINEAR	·	3.3 km	MPC · JPL
93164 Gordontelepun	2000 SR_{89}	Gordontelepun	September 29, 2000	Emerald Lane	L. Ball	·	2.3 km	MPC · JPL
93165	2000 SE_{93}	—	September 23, 2000	Socorro	LINEAR	·	4.5 km	MPC · JPL
93166	2000 SF_{95}	—	September 23, 2000	Socorro	LINEAR	·	4.7 km	MPC · JPL
93167	2000 SS_{95}	—	September 23, 2000	Socorro	LINEAR	·	2.1 km	MPC · JPL
93168	2000 SZ_{96}	—	September 23, 2000	Socorro	LINEAR	·	1.9 km	MPC · JPL
93169	2000 SC_{98}	—	September 23, 2000	Socorro	LINEAR	(5)	4.2 km	MPC · JPL
93170	2000 SS_{98}	—	September 23, 2000	Socorro	LINEAR	·	2.8 km	MPC · JPL
93171	2000 SJ_{99}	—	September 23, 2000	Socorro	LINEAR	MAR	1.8 km	MPC · JPL
93172	2000 SQ_{100}	—	September 23, 2000	Socorro	LINEAR	·	2.9 km	MPC · JPL
93173	2000 SQ_{101}	—	September 24, 2000	Socorro	LINEAR	·	3.3 km	MPC · JPL
93174	2000 SY_{101}	—	September 24, 2000	Socorro	LINEAR	MAR	3.3 km	MPC · JPL
93175	2000 SL_{102}	—	September 24, 2000	Socorro	LINEAR	·	2.3 km	MPC · JPL
93176	2000 SA_{103}	—	September 24, 2000	Socorro	LINEAR	·	2.8 km	MPC · JPL
93177	2000 SP_{103}	—	September 24, 2000	Socorro	LINEAR	·	2.9 km	MPC · JPL
93178	2000 SW_{103}	—	September 24, 2000	Socorro	LINEAR	V	1.6 km	MPC · JPL
93179	2000 SH_{104}	—	September 24, 2000	Socorro	LINEAR	·	3.2 km	MPC · JPL
93180	2000 SS_{104}	—	September 24, 2000	Socorro	LINEAR	·	3.5 km	MPC · JPL
93181	2000 ST_{104}	—	September 24, 2000	Socorro	LINEAR	EUN	2.0 km	MPC · JPL
93182	2000 SB_{105}	—	September 24, 2000	Socorro	LINEAR	(5)	3.1 km	MPC · JPL
93183	2000 SC_{106}	—	September 24, 2000	Socorro	LINEAR	·	2.7 km	MPC · JPL
93184	2000 SV_{107}	—	September 24, 2000	Socorro	LINEAR	·	1.6 km	MPC · JPL
93185	2000 SH_{108}	—	September 24, 2000	Socorro	LINEAR	·	2.8 km	MPC · JPL
93186	2000 SR_{108}	—	September 24, 2000	Socorro	LINEAR	·	2.8 km	MPC · JPL
93187	2000 SV_{109}	—	September 24, 2000	Socorro	LINEAR	·	4.5 km	MPC · JPL
93188	2000 SF_{110}	—	September 24, 2000	Socorro	LINEAR	·	1.8 km	MPC · JPL
93189	2000 SZ_{110}	—	September 24, 2000	Socorro	LINEAR	·	3.8 km	MPC · JPL
93190	2000 SN_{111}	—	September 24, 2000	Socorro	LINEAR	·	2.6 km	MPC · JPL
93191	2000 SO_{111}	—	September 24, 2000	Socorro	LINEAR	MAS	2.8 km	MPC · JPL
93192	2000 SV_{111}	—	September 24, 2000	Socorro	LINEAR	·	2.0 km	MPC · JPL
93193	2000 SC_{112}	—	September 24, 2000	Socorro	LINEAR	·	3.8 km	MPC · JPL
93194	2000 SD_{112}	—	September 24, 2000	Socorro	LINEAR	NYS	2.3 km	MPC · JPL
93195	2000 SV_{112}	—	September 24, 2000	Socorro	LINEAR	·	2.7 km	MPC · JPL
93196	2000 SU_{113}	—	September 24, 2000	Socorro	LINEAR	·	2.5 km	MPC · JPL
93197	2000 SO_{114}	—	September 24, 2000	Socorro	LINEAR	MAR	2.8 km	MPC · JPL
93198	2000 ST_{114}	—	September 24, 2000	Socorro	LINEAR	·	3.0 km	MPC · JPL
93199	2000 SF_{115}	—	September 24, 2000	Socorro	LINEAR	·	3.9 km	MPC · JPL
93200	2000 SS_{115}	—	September 24, 2000	Socorro	LINEAR	EUN	2.3 km	MPC · JPL

== 93201–93300 ==
back to top

Designation			Discovery			Properties		Ref
Permanent	Provisional	Named after	Date	Site	Discoverer(s)	Category	Diam.	Ref
93201	2000 SZ_{115}	—	September 24, 2000	Socorro	LINEAR	·	3.8 km	MPC · JPL
93202	2000 SU_{116}	—	September 24, 2000	Socorro	LINEAR	·	2.6 km	MPC · JPL
93203	2000 SN_{118}	—	September 24, 2000	Socorro	LINEAR	·	2.8 km	MPC · JPL
93204	2000 SQ_{118}	—	September 24, 2000	Socorro	LINEAR	·	2.3 km	MPC · JPL
93205	2000 ST_{119}	—	September 24, 2000	Socorro	LINEAR	·	1.9 km	MPC · JPL
93206	2000 SS_{122}	—	September 24, 2000	Socorro	LINEAR	·	2.7 km	MPC · JPL
93207	2000 SY_{122}	—	September 24, 2000	Socorro	LINEAR	·	3.0 km	MPC · JPL
93208	2000 SQ_{123}	—	September 24, 2000	Socorro	LINEAR	·	2.6 km	MPC · JPL
93209	2000 SL_{125}	—	September 24, 2000	Socorro	LINEAR	·	2.9 km	MPC · JPL
93210	2000 SS_{126}	—	September 24, 2000	Socorro	LINEAR	·	3.3 km	MPC · JPL
93211	2000 SU_{126}	—	September 24, 2000	Socorro	LINEAR	WIT	1.8 km	MPC · JPL
93212	2000 SA_{127}	—	September 24, 2000	Socorro	LINEAR	·	2.4 km	MPC · JPL
93213	2000 SA_{128}	—	September 24, 2000	Socorro	LINEAR	·	11 km	MPC · JPL
93214	2000 SB_{128}	—	September 24, 2000	Socorro	LINEAR	·	2.6 km	MPC · JPL
93215	2000 SL_{128}	—	September 24, 2000	Socorro	LINEAR	(5)	3.0 km	MPC · JPL
93216	2000 ST_{128}	—	September 24, 2000	Socorro	LINEAR	·	3.4 km	MPC · JPL
93217	2000 SR_{130}	—	September 22, 2000	Socorro	LINEAR	·	2.6 km	MPC · JPL
93218	2000 SJ_{131}	—	September 22, 2000	Socorro	LINEAR	EUN	2.2 km	MPC · JPL
93219	2000 SG_{133}	—	September 23, 2000	Socorro	LINEAR	·	2.3 km	MPC · JPL
93220	2000 SA_{135}	—	September 23, 2000	Socorro	LINEAR	EUN	2.4 km	MPC · JPL
93221	2000 SE_{140}	—	September 23, 2000	Socorro	LINEAR	·	9.0 km	MPC · JPL
93222	2000 SL_{140}	—	September 23, 2000	Socorro	LINEAR	·	3.1 km	MPC · JPL
93223	2000 SC_{141}	—	September 23, 2000	Socorro	LINEAR	·	5.8 km	MPC · JPL
93224	2000 SR_{141}	—	September 23, 2000	Socorro	LINEAR	V	1.2 km	MPC · JPL
93225	2000 SE_{142}	—	September 23, 2000	Socorro	LINEAR	ADE	6.7 km	MPC · JPL
93226	2000 SJ_{142}	—	September 23, 2000	Socorro	LINEAR	·	2.8 km	MPC · JPL
93227	2000 SU_{142}	—	September 23, 2000	Socorro	LINEAR	EUN	4.1 km	MPC · JPL
93228	2000 SH_{144}	—	September 24, 2000	Socorro	LINEAR	·	2.4 km	MPC · JPL
93229	2000 SJ_{144}	—	September 24, 2000	Socorro	LINEAR	·	2.1 km	MPC · JPL
93230	2000 SW_{144}	—	September 24, 2000	Socorro	LINEAR	·	2.6 km	MPC · JPL
93231	2000 SK_{146}	—	September 24, 2000	Socorro	LINEAR	(5)	2.3 km	MPC · JPL
93232	2000 SE_{147}	—	September 24, 2000	Socorro	LINEAR	·	4.8 km	MPC · JPL
93233	2000 SN_{147}	—	September 24, 2000	Socorro	LINEAR	·	2.4 km	MPC · JPL
93234	2000 SS_{147}	—	September 24, 2000	Socorro	LINEAR	·	2.1 km	MPC · JPL
93235	2000 SE_{148}	—	September 24, 2000	Socorro	LINEAR	·	3.2 km	MPC · JPL
93236	2000 SR_{149}	—	September 24, 2000	Socorro	LINEAR	·	4.9 km	MPC · JPL
93237	2000 SX_{149}	—	September 24, 2000	Socorro	LINEAR	NYS	3.6 km	MPC · JPL
93238	2000 SH_{150}	—	September 24, 2000	Socorro	LINEAR	NYS	2.8 km	MPC · JPL
93239	2000 SO_{150}	—	September 24, 2000	Socorro	LINEAR	·	7.3 km	MPC · JPL
93240	2000 SB_{152}	—	September 24, 2000	Socorro	LINEAR	·	3.0 km	MPC · JPL
93241	2000 SO_{152}	—	September 24, 2000	Socorro	LINEAR	·	2.9 km	MPC · JPL
93242	2000 SF_{153}	—	September 24, 2000	Socorro	LINEAR	·	3.4 km	MPC · JPL
93243	2000 SA_{154}	—	September 24, 2000	Socorro	LINEAR	·	2.6 km	MPC · JPL
93244	2000 SE_{154}	—	September 24, 2000	Socorro	LINEAR	·	3.0 km	MPC · JPL
93245	2000 SH_{155}	—	September 24, 2000	Socorro	LINEAR	EUN ·	5.1 km	MPC · JPL
93246	2000 SR_{156}	—	September 24, 2000	Socorro	LINEAR	·	4.4 km	MPC · JPL
93247	2000 ST_{156}	—	September 24, 2000	Socorro	LINEAR	HNS	2.7 km	MPC · JPL
93248	2000 SD_{157}	—	September 26, 2000	Socorro	LINEAR	EUN	2.8 km	MPC · JPL
93249	2000 SL_{157}	—	September 27, 2000	Socorro	LINEAR	·	3.7 km	MPC · JPL
93250	2000 SP_{157}	—	September 27, 2000	Socorro	LINEAR	·	2.2 km	MPC · JPL
93251	2000 SZ_{157}	—	September 27, 2000	Socorro	LINEAR	·	2.8 km	MPC · JPL
93252	2000 SS_{160}	—	September 27, 2000	Socorro	LINEAR	·	4.1 km	MPC · JPL
93253	2000 SB_{161}	—	September 27, 2000	Socorro	LINEAR	·	4.0 km	MPC · JPL
93254	2000 SF_{161}	—	September 27, 2000	Socorro	LINEAR	·	7.3 km	MPC · JPL
93255	2000 SC_{163}	—	September 29, 2000	Ondřejov	P. Kušnirák, P. Pravec	·	2.0 km	MPC · JPL
93256 Stach	2000 SD_{163}	Stach	September 29, 2000	Ondřejov	P. Pravec, P. Kušnirák	·	3.8 km	MPC · JPL
93257	2000 SQ_{165}	—	September 23, 2000	Socorro	LINEAR	slow	3.2 km	MPC · JPL
93258	2000 SX_{165}	—	September 23, 2000	Socorro	LINEAR	·	3.8 km	MPC · JPL
93259	2000 SD_{166}	—	September 23, 2000	Socorro	LINEAR	·	2.3 km	MPC · JPL
93260	2000 SB_{168}	—	September 23, 2000	Socorro	LINEAR	·	4.1 km	MPC · JPL
93261	2000 SN_{168}	—	September 23, 2000	Socorro	LINEAR	V	1.6 km	MPC · JPL
93262	2000 SR_{168}	—	September 23, 2000	Socorro	LINEAR	·	8.4 km	MPC · JPL
93263	2000 ST_{170}	—	September 24, 2000	Socorro	LINEAR	·	6.2 km	MPC · JPL
93264	2000 SP_{171}	—	September 25, 2000	Socorro	LINEAR	·	4.5 km	MPC · JPL
93265	2000 SV_{171}	—	September 26, 2000	Socorro	LINEAR	·	6.2 km	MPC · JPL
93266	2000 SW_{171}	—	September 26, 2000	Socorro	LINEAR	·	4.2 km	MPC · JPL
93267	2000 SS_{173}	—	September 28, 2000	Socorro	LINEAR	EUN	2.7 km	MPC · JPL
93268	2000 SX_{173}	—	September 28, 2000	Socorro	LINEAR	ADE	4.4 km	MPC · JPL
93269	2000 SL_{175}	—	September 28, 2000	Socorro	LINEAR	·	5.2 km	MPC · JPL
93270	2000 SQ_{175}	—	September 28, 2000	Socorro	LINEAR	·	3.2 km	MPC · JPL
93271	2000 SS_{175}	—	September 28, 2000	Socorro	LINEAR	slow	3.6 km	MPC · JPL
93272	2000 ST_{176}	—	September 28, 2000	Socorro	LINEAR	·	2.9 km	MPC · JPL
93273	2000 SE_{177}	—	September 28, 2000	Socorro	LINEAR	·	3.2 km	MPC · JPL
93274	2000 SC_{178}	—	September 28, 2000	Socorro	LINEAR	·	3.9 km	MPC · JPL
93275	2000 SO_{178}	—	September 28, 2000	Socorro	LINEAR	·	2.5 km	MPC · JPL
93276	2000 ST_{178}	—	September 28, 2000	Socorro	LINEAR	·	2.4 km	MPC · JPL
93277	2000 SJ_{179}	—	September 28, 2000	Socorro	LINEAR	EUN	3.0 km	MPC · JPL
93278	2000 SS_{181}	—	September 19, 2000	Haleakala	NEAT	·	4.0 km	MPC · JPL
93279	2000 SU_{181}	—	September 19, 2000	Haleakala	NEAT	·	2.8 km	MPC · JPL
93280	2000 SW_{186}	—	September 21, 2000	Haleakala	NEAT	PHO	4.7 km	MPC · JPL
93281	2000 SJ_{187}	—	September 21, 2000	Haleakala	NEAT	·	1.7 km	MPC · JPL
93282	2000 SK_{187}	—	September 21, 2000	Haleakala	NEAT	·	2.1 km	MPC · JPL
93283	2000 SP_{188}	—	September 21, 2000	Haleakala	NEAT	EUN	3.2 km	MPC · JPL
93284	2000 SY_{188}	—	September 22, 2000	Kitt Peak	Spacewatch	·	1.8 km	MPC · JPL
93285	2000 SQ_{189}	—	September 22, 2000	Haleakala	NEAT	·	5.4 km	MPC · JPL
93286	2000 SV_{191}	—	September 24, 2000	Socorro	LINEAR	·	4.8 km	MPC · JPL
93287	2000 SG_{194}	—	September 24, 2000	Socorro	LINEAR	(5)	2.0 km	MPC · JPL
93288	2000 SA_{196}	—	September 24, 2000	Socorro	LINEAR	HNS	3.0 km	MPC · JPL
93289	2000 SC_{196}	—	September 24, 2000	Socorro	LINEAR	EUN	2.3 km	MPC · JPL
93290	2000 SP_{196}	—	September 24, 2000	Socorro	LINEAR	·	3.3 km	MPC · JPL
93291	2000 SV_{196}	—	September 24, 2000	Socorro	LINEAR	·	2.3 km	MPC · JPL
93292	2000 SD_{198}	—	September 24, 2000	Socorro	LINEAR	·	2.1 km	MPC · JPL
93293	2000 SM_{199}	—	September 24, 2000	Socorro	LINEAR	NEM	4.2 km	MPC · JPL
93294	2000 SY_{199}	—	September 24, 2000	Socorro	LINEAR	·	2.2 km	MPC · JPL
93295	2000 SC_{201}	—	September 24, 2000	Socorro	LINEAR	·	1.7 km	MPC · JPL
93296	2000 SU_{202}	—	September 24, 2000	Socorro	LINEAR	(5)	2.0 km	MPC · JPL
93297	2000 ST_{203}	—	September 24, 2000	Socorro	LINEAR	·	1.6 km	MPC · JPL
93298	2000 SH_{205}	—	September 24, 2000	Socorro	LINEAR	·	2.3 km	MPC · JPL
93299	2000 SC_{206}	—	September 24, 2000	Socorro	LINEAR	·	2.3 km	MPC · JPL
93300	2000 SD_{206}	—	September 24, 2000	Socorro	LINEAR	·	2.2 km	MPC · JPL

== 93301–93400 ==
back to top

Designation			Discovery			Properties		Ref
Permanent	Provisional	Named after	Date	Site	Discoverer(s)	Category	Diam.	Ref
93301	2000 SE_{206}	—	September 24, 2000	Socorro	LINEAR	·	3.3 km	MPC · JPL
93302	2000 SJ_{206}	—	September 24, 2000	Socorro	LINEAR	·	3.6 km	MPC · JPL
93303	2000 SM_{206}	—	September 24, 2000	Socorro	LINEAR	·	3.4 km	MPC · JPL
93304	2000 SV_{206}	—	September 24, 2000	Socorro	LINEAR	·	2.2 km	MPC · JPL
93305	2000 SK_{208}	—	September 24, 2000	Socorro	LINEAR	·	2.9 km	MPC · JPL
93306	2000 SE_{209}	—	September 25, 2000	Socorro	LINEAR	·	2.8 km	MPC · JPL
93307	2000 SV_{209}	—	September 25, 2000	Socorro	LINEAR	·	3.7 km	MPC · JPL
93308	2000 SV_{211}	—	September 25, 2000	Socorro	LINEAR	·	3.5 km	MPC · JPL
93309	2000 SB_{212}	—	September 25, 2000	Socorro	LINEAR	·	2.4 km	MPC · JPL
93310	2000 SU_{212}	—	September 25, 2000	Socorro	LINEAR	·	2.7 km	MPC · JPL
93311	2000 SN_{213}	—	September 25, 2000	Socorro	LINEAR	·	3.8 km	MPC · JPL
93312	2000 SV_{215}	—	September 26, 2000	Socorro	LINEAR	·	2.4 km	MPC · JPL
93313	2000 SY_{216}	—	September 26, 2000	Socorro	LINEAR	·	1.6 km	MPC · JPL
93314	2000 SC_{217}	—	September 26, 2000	Socorro	LINEAR	HNS	5.0 km	MPC · JPL
93315	2000 SF_{217}	—	September 26, 2000	Socorro	LINEAR	PAD	4.7 km	MPC · JPL
93316	2000 SN_{217}	—	September 26, 2000	Socorro	LINEAR	·	3.2 km	MPC · JPL
93317	2000 SQ_{217}	—	September 26, 2000	Socorro	LINEAR	·	5.6 km	MPC · JPL
93318	2000 SQ_{218}	—	September 26, 2000	Socorro	LINEAR	RAF	1.8 km	MPC · JPL
93319	2000 SL_{219}	—	September 26, 2000	Socorro	LINEAR	EUN	2.8 km	MPC · JPL
93320	2000 SO_{219}	—	September 26, 2000	Socorro	LINEAR	·	2.1 km	MPC · JPL
93321	2000 SA_{220}	—	September 26, 2000	Socorro	LINEAR	EUN	3.6 km	MPC · JPL
93322	2000 SA_{221}	—	September 26, 2000	Socorro	LINEAR	·	3.3 km	MPC · JPL
93323	2000 SL_{221}	—	September 26, 2000	Socorro	LINEAR	·	3.0 km	MPC · JPL
93324	2000 SG_{225}	—	September 27, 2000	Socorro	LINEAR	·	2.0 km	MPC · JPL
93325	2000 SB_{226}	—	September 27, 2000	Socorro	LINEAR	·	2.5 km	MPC · JPL
93326	2000 SE_{227}	—	September 27, 2000	Socorro	LINEAR	EUN	2.7 km	MPC · JPL
93327	2000 SA_{229}	—	September 28, 2000	Socorro	LINEAR	·	3.0 km	MPC · JPL
93328	2000 SB_{229}	—	September 28, 2000	Socorro	LINEAR	(5)	2.6 km	MPC · JPL
93329	2000 SJ_{230}	—	September 28, 2000	Socorro	LINEAR	·	4.1 km	MPC · JPL
93330	2000 SP_{230}	—	September 28, 2000	Socorro	LINEAR	·	3.2 km	MPC · JPL
93331	2000 SF_{231}	—	September 30, 2000	Socorro	LINEAR	AEO	2.2 km	MPC · JPL
93332	2000 ST_{234}	—	September 24, 2000	Socorro	LINEAR	ERI	5.4 km	MPC · JPL
93333	2000 SA_{235}	—	September 24, 2000	Socorro	LINEAR	MAS	1.1 km	MPC · JPL
93334	2000 SC_{235}	—	September 24, 2000	Socorro	LINEAR	·	2.4 km	MPC · JPL
93335	2000 SK_{235}	—	September 24, 2000	Socorro	LINEAR	·	1.6 km	MPC · JPL
93336	2000 SF_{236}	—	September 24, 2000	Socorro	LINEAR	EUN	2.0 km	MPC · JPL
93337	2000 SK_{236}	—	September 24, 2000	Socorro	LINEAR	·	2.7 km	MPC · JPL
93338	2000 SJ_{237}	—	September 24, 2000	Socorro	LINEAR	·	2.0 km	MPC · JPL
93339	2000 SM_{241}	—	September 24, 2000	Socorro	LINEAR	V	1.7 km	MPC · JPL
93340	2000 SJ_{243}	—	September 24, 2000	Socorro	LINEAR	NYS	2.4 km	MPC · JPL
93341	2000 SP_{244}	—	September 24, 2000	Socorro	LINEAR	·	3.0 km	MPC · JPL
93342	2000 SR_{244}	—	September 24, 2000	Socorro	LINEAR	·	2.9 km	MPC · JPL
93343	2000 SV_{245}	—	September 24, 2000	Socorro	LINEAR	·	2.8 km	MPC · JPL
93344	2000 SY_{245}	—	September 24, 2000	Socorro	LINEAR	·	2.7 km	MPC · JPL
93345	2000 SG_{246}	—	September 24, 2000	Socorro	LINEAR	ERI	5.0 km	MPC · JPL
93346	2000 SO_{247}	—	September 24, 2000	Socorro	LINEAR	·	2.5 km	MPC · JPL
93347	2000 SX_{247}	—	September 24, 2000	Socorro	LINEAR	·	4.2 km	MPC · JPL
93348	2000 SP_{250}	—	September 24, 2000	Socorro	LINEAR	(5)	3.2 km	MPC · JPL
93349	2000 SJ_{251}	—	September 24, 2000	Socorro	LINEAR	NYS	2.8 km	MPC · JPL
93350	2000 SR_{252}	—	September 24, 2000	Socorro	LINEAR	·	2.6 km	MPC · JPL
93351	2000 SX_{252}	—	September 24, 2000	Socorro	LINEAR	MRX	2.7 km	MPC · JPL
93352	2000 SZ_{252}	—	September 24, 2000	Socorro	LINEAR	·	2.2 km	MPC · JPL
93353	2000 SF_{253}	—	September 24, 2000	Socorro	LINEAR	·	2.8 km	MPC · JPL
93354	2000 SL_{256}	—	September 24, 2000	Socorro	LINEAR	·	2.5 km	MPC · JPL
93355	2000 SK_{257}	—	September 24, 2000	Socorro	LINEAR	·	1.7 km	MPC · JPL
93356	2000 SM_{260}	—	September 24, 2000	Socorro	LINEAR	HNS	3.2 km	MPC · JPL
93357	2000 SP_{261}	—	September 24, 2000	Socorro	LINEAR	·	3.2 km	MPC · JPL
93358	2000 SS_{261}	—	September 24, 2000	Socorro	LINEAR	·	2.4 km	MPC · JPL
93359	2000 SA_{262}	—	September 24, 2000	Socorro	LINEAR	·	5.2 km	MPC · JPL
93360	2000 ST_{262}	—	September 25, 2000	Socorro	LINEAR	·	3.6 km	MPC · JPL
93361	2000 SY_{262}	—	September 25, 2000	Socorro	LINEAR	MAR	2.7 km	MPC · JPL
93362	2000 SQ_{263}	—	September 26, 2000	Socorro	LINEAR	·	2.1 km	MPC · JPL
93363	2000 SA_{264}	—	September 26, 2000	Socorro	LINEAR	·	1.8 km	MPC · JPL
93364	2000 SU_{265}	—	September 26, 2000	Socorro	LINEAR	(5)	3.8 km	MPC · JPL
93365	2000 SR_{266}	—	September 26, 2000	Socorro	LINEAR	·	2.7 km	MPC · JPL
93366	2000 SJ_{267}	—	September 27, 2000	Socorro	LINEAR	·	2.1 km	MPC · JPL
93367	2000 SK_{268}	—	September 27, 2000	Socorro	LINEAR	·	3.5 km	MPC · JPL
93368	2000 SO_{268}	—	September 27, 2000	Socorro	LINEAR	EUN	3.6 km	MPC · JPL
93369	2000 SQ_{268}	—	September 27, 2000	Socorro	LINEAR	·	2.9 km	MPC · JPL
93370	2000 SY_{268}	—	September 27, 2000	Socorro	LINEAR	·	1.8 km	MPC · JPL
93371	2000 SP_{269}	—	September 27, 2000	Socorro	LINEAR	·	3.0 km	MPC · JPL
93372	2000 SV_{269}	—	September 27, 2000	Socorro	LINEAR	·	2.9 km	MPC · JPL
93373	2000 SJ_{270}	—	September 27, 2000	Socorro	LINEAR	·	2.3 km	MPC · JPL
93374	2000 SK_{270}	—	September 27, 2000	Socorro	LINEAR	·	4.1 km	MPC · JPL
93375	2000 SY_{270}	—	September 27, 2000	Socorro	LINEAR	·	2.7 km	MPC · JPL
93376	2000 SF_{271}	—	September 27, 2000	Socorro	LINEAR	·	4.6 km	MPC · JPL
93377	2000 SO_{271}	—	September 27, 2000	Socorro	LINEAR	·	2.3 km	MPC · JPL
93378	2000 SQ_{271}	—	September 27, 2000	Socorro	LINEAR	EUN	3.3 km	MPC · JPL
93379	2000 SU_{275}	—	September 28, 2000	Socorro	LINEAR	HNS	3.1 km	MPC · JPL
93380	2000 SA_{276}	—	September 28, 2000	Socorro	LINEAR	·	2.2 km	MPC · JPL
93381	2000 SK_{276}	—	September 30, 2000	Socorro	LINEAR	·	2.7 km	MPC · JPL
93382	2000 SB_{277}	—	September 30, 2000	Socorro	LINEAR	EUN	2.8 km	MPC · JPL
93383	2000 SG_{277}	—	September 30, 2000	Socorro	LINEAR	·	2.1 km	MPC · JPL
93384	2000 SY_{277}	—	September 30, 2000	Socorro	LINEAR	·	2.8 km	MPC · JPL
93385	2000 SS_{278}	—	September 30, 2000	Socorro	LINEAR	·	3.9 km	MPC · JPL
93386	2000 SH_{279}	—	September 30, 2000	Socorro	LINEAR	·	3.5 km	MPC · JPL
93387	2000 SR_{279}	—	September 25, 2000	Socorro	LINEAR	·	2.7 km	MPC · JPL
93388	2000 ST_{279}	—	September 25, 2000	Socorro	LINEAR	·	3.6 km	MPC · JPL
93389	2000 SK_{280}	—	September 30, 2000	Socorro	LINEAR	·	4.9 km	MPC · JPL
93390	2000 SC_{281}	—	September 23, 2000	Socorro	LINEAR	PHO	3.5 km	MPC · JPL
93391	2000 SE_{282}	—	September 23, 2000	Socorro	LINEAR	·	2.7 km	MPC · JPL
93392	2000 SX_{284}	—	September 23, 2000	Socorro	LINEAR	·	2.4 km	MPC · JPL
93393	2000 SB_{285}	—	September 23, 2000	Socorro	LINEAR	·	3.8 km	MPC · JPL
93394	2000 ST_{285}	—	September 23, 2000	Socorro	LINEAR	V	2.2 km	MPC · JPL
93395	2000 SQ_{286}	—	September 26, 2000	Socorro	LINEAR	·	2.9 km	MPC · JPL
93396	2000 SG_{287}	—	September 26, 2000	Socorro	LINEAR	MAR	2.4 km	MPC · JPL
93397	2000 SH_{287}	—	September 26, 2000	Socorro	LINEAR	·	5.6 km	MPC · JPL
93398	2000 SL_{287}	—	September 26, 2000	Socorro	LINEAR	slow	8.2 km	MPC · JPL
93399	2000 SC_{288}	—	September 26, 2000	Socorro	LINEAR	EUN	3.4 km	MPC · JPL
93400	2000 SW_{288}	—	September 27, 2000	Socorro	LINEAR	·	2.7 km	MPC · JPL

== 93401–93500 ==
back to top

Designation			Discovery			Properties		Ref
Permanent	Provisional	Named after	Date	Site	Discoverer(s)	Category	Diam.	Ref
93401	2000 SE_{293}	—	September 27, 2000	Socorro	LINEAR	EUN	2.7 km	MPC · JPL
93402	2000 SG_{293}	—	September 27, 2000	Socorro	LINEAR	PHO	4.1 km	MPC · JPL
93403	2000 SM_{293}	—	September 27, 2000	Socorro	LINEAR	·	3.7 km	MPC · JPL
93404	2000 SQ_{293}	—	September 27, 2000	Socorro	LINEAR	EUN	2.7 km	MPC · JPL
93405	2000 SV_{293}	—	September 27, 2000	Socorro	LINEAR	·	2.8 km	MPC · JPL
93406	2000 SZ_{293}	—	September 27, 2000	Socorro	LINEAR	HNS	3.9 km	MPC · JPL
93407	2000 SM_{294}	—	September 27, 2000	Socorro	LINEAR	·	3.2 km	MPC · JPL
93408	2000 SV_{294}	—	September 27, 2000	Socorro	LINEAR	·	3.2 km	MPC · JPL
93409	2000 SS_{296}	—	September 28, 2000	Socorro	LINEAR	·	2.4 km	MPC · JPL
93410	2000 SJ_{297}	—	September 28, 2000	Socorro	LINEAR	·	3.8 km	MPC · JPL
93411	2000 SY_{298}	—	September 28, 2000	Socorro	LINEAR	V	1.7 km	MPC · JPL
93412	2000 ST_{300}	—	September 28, 2000	Socorro	LINEAR	(5)	2.2 km	MPC · JPL
93413	2000 SB_{301}	—	September 28, 2000	Socorro	LINEAR	·	1.9 km	MPC · JPL
93414	2000 SC_{301}	—	September 28, 2000	Socorro	LINEAR	·	2.8 km	MPC · JPL
93415	2000 SW_{301}	—	September 28, 2000	Socorro	LINEAR	·	3.6 km	MPC · JPL
93416	2000 SG_{303}	—	September 28, 2000	Socorro	LINEAR	·	2.1 km	MPC · JPL
93417	2000 SV_{303}	—	September 28, 2000	Socorro	LINEAR	·	7.5 km	MPC · JPL
93418	2000 SB_{305}	—	September 30, 2000	Socorro	LINEAR	·	5.2 km	MPC · JPL
93419	2000 SS_{305}	—	September 30, 2000	Socorro	LINEAR	EUN	2.3 km	MPC · JPL
93420	2000 SC_{307}	—	September 30, 2000	Socorro	LINEAR	·	3.4 km	MPC · JPL
93421	2000 SK_{307}	—	September 30, 2000	Socorro	LINEAR	EUN	2.6 km	MPC · JPL
93422	2000 SB_{308}	—	September 30, 2000	Socorro	LINEAR	MAR	2.3 km	MPC · JPL
93423	2000 SG_{308}	—	September 30, 2000	Socorro	LINEAR	·	4.8 km	MPC · JPL
93424	2000 SP_{312}	—	September 27, 2000	Socorro	LINEAR	·	3.0 km	MPC · JPL
93425	2000 SC_{314}	—	September 27, 2000	Socorro	LINEAR	·	3.7 km	MPC · JPL
93426	2000 SQ_{315}	—	September 28, 2000	Socorro	LINEAR	·	3.3 km	MPC · JPL
93427	2000 SY_{315}	—	September 30, 2000	Socorro	LINEAR	·	2.8 km	MPC · JPL
93428	2000 ST_{316}	—	September 30, 2000	Socorro	LINEAR	EUN	2.2 km	MPC · JPL
93429	2000 SE_{317}	—	September 30, 2000	Socorro	LINEAR	EUN	2.4 km	MPC · JPL
93430	2000 SG_{317}	—	September 30, 2000	Socorro	LINEAR	·	2.7 km	MPC · JPL
93431	2000 SS_{317}	—	September 30, 2000	Socorro	LINEAR	·	4.8 km	MPC · JPL
93432	2000 SN_{318}	—	September 26, 2000	Socorro	LINEAR	PHO	6.0 km	MPC · JPL
93433	2000 SN_{319}	—	September 26, 2000	Socorro	LINEAR	·	4.1 km	MPC · JPL
93434	2000 ST_{319}	—	September 26, 2000	Socorro	LINEAR	CLO	6.3 km	MPC · JPL
93435	2000 SS_{320}	—	September 27, 2000	Socorro	LINEAR	·	2.9 km	MPC · JPL
93436	2000 SO_{326}	—	September 29, 2000	Kitt Peak	Spacewatch	·	3.1 km	MPC · JPL
93437	2000 SG_{327}	—	September 29, 2000	Haleakala	NEAT	JUN	3.4 km	MPC · JPL
93438	2000 SR_{327}	—	September 30, 2000	Socorro	LINEAR	·	2.7 km	MPC · JPL
93439	2000 SF_{328}	—	September 30, 2000	Socorro	LINEAR	·	4.6 km	MPC · JPL
93440	2000 SX_{328}	—	September 27, 2000	Socorro	LINEAR	HNS	3.1 km	MPC · JPL
93441	2000 SV_{330}	—	September 27, 2000	Kitt Peak	Spacewatch	MIS	4.1 km	MPC · JPL
93442	2000 SO_{333}	—	September 26, 2000	Haleakala	NEAT	·	2.5 km	MPC · JPL
93443	2000 SK_{336}	—	September 26, 2000	Haleakala	NEAT	·	2.4 km	MPC · JPL
93444	2000 SN_{336}	—	September 26, 2000	Haleakala	NEAT	DOR	6.1 km	MPC · JPL
93445	2000 SU_{336}	—	September 26, 2000	Haleakala	NEAT	·	3.7 km	MPC · JPL
93446	2000 SV_{339}	—	September 25, 2000	Kitt Peak	Spacewatch	·	2.8 km	MPC · JPL
93447	2000 SZ_{339}	—	September 25, 2000	Kitt Peak	Spacewatch	·	3.5 km	MPC · JPL
93448	2000 SA_{345}	—	September 20, 2000	Socorro	LINEAR	·	5.7 km	MPC · JPL
93449	2000 SD_{347}	—	September 25, 2000	Socorro	LINEAR	·	4.5 km	MPC · JPL
93450	2000 SP_{347}	—	September 22, 2000	Socorro	LINEAR	HNS	2.6 km	MPC · JPL
93451	2000 SE_{349}	—	September 30, 2000	Anderson Mesa	LONEOS	EUN	2.3 km	MPC · JPL
93452	2000 SY_{351}	—	September 29, 2000	Anderson Mesa	LONEOS	EUN	2.8 km	MPC · JPL
93453	2000 SZ_{351}	—	September 26, 2000	Anderson Mesa	LONEOS	·	2.0 km	MPC · JPL
93454	2000 SP_{352}	—	September 30, 2000	Anderson Mesa	LONEOS	EUN	3.5 km	MPC · JPL
93455	2000 SS_{352}	—	September 30, 2000	Anderson Mesa	LONEOS	·	4.5 km	MPC · JPL
93456	2000 SG_{357}	—	September 28, 2000	Anderson Mesa	LONEOS	·	6.9 km	MPC · JPL
93457	2000 ST_{358}	—	September 25, 2000	Socorro	LINEAR	·	2.9 km	MPC · JPL
93458	2000 SX_{358}	—	September 25, 2000	Haleakala	NEAT	·	2.5 km	MPC · JPL
93459	2000 SK_{360}	—	September 26, 2000	Anderson Mesa	LONEOS	GEF	2.5 km	MPC · JPL
93460	2000 SV_{360}	—	September 22, 2000	Anderson Mesa	LONEOS	·	2.0 km	MPC · JPL
93461	2000 ST_{363}	—	September 20, 2000	Socorro	LINEAR	·	2.3 km	MPC · JPL
93462	2000 SJ_{367}	—	September 22, 2000	Haleakala	NEAT	·	2.4 km	MPC · JPL
93463	2000 SC_{368}	—	September 24, 2000	Socorro	LINEAR	·	2.4 km	MPC · JPL
93464	2000 SA_{369}	—	September 23, 2000	Anderson Mesa	LONEOS	·	2.2 km	MPC · JPL
93465	2000 SY_{369}	—	September 24, 2000	Anderson Mesa	LONEOS	·	2.1 km	MPC · JPL
93466	2000 TO	—	October 2, 2000	Emerald Lane	L. Ball	DOR	5.1 km	MPC · JPL
93467	2000 TM_{5}	—	October 1, 2000	Socorro	LINEAR	·	2.5 km	MPC · JPL
93468	2000 TY_{5}	—	October 1, 2000	Socorro	LINEAR	·	2.6 km	MPC · JPL
93469	2000 TW_{10}	—	October 1, 2000	Socorro	LINEAR	·	2.0 km	MPC · JPL
93470	2000 TW_{11}	—	October 1, 2000	Socorro	LINEAR	·	3.4 km	MPC · JPL
93471	2000 TU_{12}	—	October 1, 2000	Socorro	LINEAR	·	4.3 km	MPC · JPL
93472	2000 TV_{12}	—	October 1, 2000	Socorro	LINEAR	·	2.9 km	MPC · JPL
93473	2000 TY_{13}	—	October 1, 2000	Socorro	LINEAR	·	3.1 km	MPC · JPL
93474	2000 TU_{14}	—	October 1, 2000	Socorro	LINEAR	·	2.9 km	MPC · JPL
93475	2000 TB_{17}	—	October 1, 2000	Socorro	LINEAR	AEG	7.9 km	MPC · JPL
93476	2000 TG_{17}	—	October 1, 2000	Socorro	LINEAR	·	2.2 km	MPC · JPL
93477	2000 TL_{17}	—	October 1, 2000	Socorro	LINEAR	·	3.1 km	MPC · JPL
93478	2000 TQ_{19}	—	October 1, 2000	Socorro	LINEAR	·	2.5 km	MPC · JPL
93479	2000 TM_{20}	—	October 1, 2000	Socorro	LINEAR	RAF	2.6 km	MPC · JPL
93480	2000 TZ_{20}	—	October 1, 2000	Socorro	LINEAR	·	2.0 km	MPC · JPL
93481	2000 TN_{21}	—	October 1, 2000	Socorro	LINEAR	EUN	2.6 km	MPC · JPL
93482	2000 TO_{21}	—	October 1, 2000	Socorro	LINEAR	EUN	1.9 km	MPC · JPL
93483	2000 TM_{22}	—	October 3, 2000	Socorro	LINEAR	GEF	2.8 km	MPC · JPL
93484	2000 TP_{22}	—	October 5, 2000	Prescott	P. G. Comba	·	2.3 km	MPC · JPL
93485	2000 TS_{24}	—	October 2, 2000	Socorro	LINEAR	·	2.5 km	MPC · JPL
93486	2000 TE_{25}	—	October 2, 2000	Socorro	LINEAR	·	3.6 km	MPC · JPL
93487	2000 TD_{26}	—	October 1, 2000	Socorro	LINEAR	·	3.0 km	MPC · JPL
93488	2000 TV_{32}	—	October 2, 2000	Socorro	LINEAR	·	4.7 km	MPC · JPL
93489	2000 TT_{33}	—	October 5, 2000	Socorro	LINEAR	·	5.5 km	MPC · JPL
93490	2000 TV_{33}	—	October 8, 2000	Emerald Lane	L. Ball	·	3.2 km	MPC · JPL
93491	2000 TC_{34}	—	October 7, 2000	Desert Beaver	W. K. Y. Yeung	·	4.2 km	MPC · JPL
93492	2000 TD_{36}	—	October 6, 2000	Anderson Mesa	LONEOS	·	2.5 km	MPC · JPL
93493	2000 TN_{38}	—	October 1, 2000	Socorro	LINEAR	EUN	6.5 km	MPC · JPL
93494	2000 TA_{39}	—	October 1, 2000	Socorro	LINEAR	·	4.6 km	MPC · JPL
93495	2000 TB_{39}	—	October 1, 2000	Socorro	LINEAR	V	1.6 km	MPC · JPL
93496	2000 TT_{41}	—	October 1, 2000	Socorro	LINEAR	·	4.8 km	MPC · JPL
93497	2000 TV_{42}	—	October 1, 2000	Socorro	LINEAR	·	2.2 km	MPC · JPL
93498	2000 TH_{45}	—	October 1, 2000	Socorro	LINEAR	EUN	2.7 km	MPC · JPL
93499	2000 TK_{46}	—	October 1, 2000	Anderson Mesa	LONEOS	·	2.2 km	MPC · JPL
93500	2000 TU_{49}	—	October 1, 2000	Socorro	LINEAR	EUN	3.4 km	MPC · JPL

== 93501–93600 ==
back to top

Designation			Discovery			Properties		Ref
Permanent	Provisional	Named after	Date	Site	Discoverer(s)	Category	Diam.	Ref
93501	2000 TE_{50}	—	October 1, 2000	Socorro	LINEAR	·	3.1 km	MPC · JPL
93502	2000 TN_{50}	—	October 1, 2000	Socorro	LINEAR	KRM	6.0 km	MPC · JPL
93503	2000 TJ_{51}	—	October 1, 2000	Socorro	LINEAR	·	2.9 km	MPC · JPL
93504	2000 TM_{52}	—	October 1, 2000	Socorro	LINEAR	·	2.7 km	MPC · JPL
93505	2000 TF_{53}	—	October 1, 2000	Socorro	LINEAR	MAR	2.3 km	MPC · JPL
93506	2000 TS_{54}	—	October 1, 2000	Socorro	LINEAR	HOF	4.6 km	MPC · JPL
93507	2000 TA_{56}	—	October 1, 2000	Socorro	LINEAR	·	3.5 km	MPC · JPL
93508	2000 TM_{56}	—	October 1, 2000	Kitt Peak	Spacewatch	·	3.9 km	MPC · JPL
93509	2000 TP_{56}	—	October 2, 2000	Anderson Mesa	LONEOS	ADE	4.8 km	MPC · JPL
93510	2000 TT_{56}	—	October 2, 2000	Socorro	LINEAR	·	2.7 km	MPC · JPL
93511	2000 TA_{60}	—	October 2, 2000	Anderson Mesa	LONEOS	EUN	3.2 km	MPC · JPL
93512	2000 TO_{60}	—	October 2, 2000	Anderson Mesa	LONEOS	·	2.9 km	MPC · JPL
93513	2000 TP_{61}	—	October 2, 2000	Anderson Mesa	LONEOS	EUN	3.2 km	MPC · JPL
93514	2000 TA_{62}	—	October 2, 2000	Anderson Mesa	LONEOS	·	5.3 km	MPC · JPL
93515	2000 TS_{62}	—	October 2, 2000	Socorro	LINEAR	·	2.2 km	MPC · JPL
93516	2000 TA_{63}	—	October 2, 2000	Socorro	LINEAR	·	2.3 km	MPC · JPL
93517	2000 TF_{63}	—	October 3, 2000	Anderson Mesa	LONEOS	·	3.1 km	MPC · JPL
93518	2000 TU_{63}	—	October 3, 2000	Socorro	LINEAR	·	2.3 km	MPC · JPL
93519	2000 TV_{63}	—	October 3, 2000	Socorro	LINEAR	·	3.4 km	MPC · JPL
93520	2000 TW_{63}	—	October 3, 2000	Socorro	LINEAR	fast	3.6 km	MPC · JPL
93521	2000 TX_{65}	—	October 1, 2000	Socorro	LINEAR	·	3.7 km	MPC · JPL
93522	2000 TK_{67}	—	October 2, 2000	Socorro	LINEAR	·	1.9 km	MPC · JPL
93523	2000 TQ_{67}	—	October 2, 2000	Socorro	LINEAR	·	3.8 km	MPC · JPL
93524	2000 UQ	—	October 20, 2000	Ondřejov	P. Kušnirák	·	5.1 km	MPC · JPL
93525	2000 UX	—	October 21, 2000	Višnjan Observatory	K. Korlević	ADE	6.8 km	MPC · JPL
93526	2000 UY	—	October 21, 2000	Višnjan Observatory	K. Korlević	KOR	3.4 km	MPC · JPL
93527	2000 UW_{1}	—	October 31, 2000	Socorro	LINEAR	T_{j} (2.94)	5.6 km	MPC · JPL
93528	2000 UL_{4}	—	October 24, 2000	Socorro	LINEAR	·	2.7 km	MPC · JPL
93529	2000 UM_{6}	—	October 24, 2000	Socorro	LINEAR	·	2.7 km	MPC · JPL
93530	2000 UW_{6}	—	October 24, 2000	Socorro	LINEAR	(5)	2.8 km	MPC · JPL
93531	2000 UA_{7}	—	October 24, 2000	Socorro	LINEAR	EUN	2.2 km	MPC · JPL
93532	2000 UL_{9}	—	October 24, 2000	Socorro	LINEAR	V	2.1 km	MPC · JPL
93533	2000 UO_{12}	—	October 24, 2000	Socorro	LINEAR	·	4.0 km	MPC · JPL
93534	2000 UU_{13}	—	October 27, 2000	Desert Beaver	W. K. Y. Yeung	·	3.3 km	MPC · JPL
93535	2000 UL_{14}	—	October 24, 2000	Socorro	LINEAR	·	3.8 km	MPC · JPL
93536	2000 UM_{14}	—	October 25, 2000	Socorro	LINEAR	·	4.3 km	MPC · JPL
93537	2000 UV_{14}	—	October 25, 2000	Socorro	LINEAR	·	7.3 km	MPC · JPL
93538	2000 UJ_{17}	—	October 24, 2000	Socorro	LINEAR	AEO	2.2 km	MPC · JPL
93539	2000 US_{17}	—	October 24, 2000	Socorro	LINEAR	slow	3.7 km	MPC · JPL
93540	2000 UG_{19}	—	October 29, 2000	Socorro	LINEAR	EUN	2.6 km	MPC · JPL
93541	2000 UT_{20}	—	October 24, 2000	Socorro	LINEAR	·	4.8 km	MPC · JPL
93542	2000 UY_{20}	—	October 24, 2000	Socorro	LINEAR	·	4.4 km	MPC · JPL
93543	2000 UG_{21}	—	October 24, 2000	Socorro	LINEAR	HOF	4.3 km	MPC · JPL
93544	2000 UV_{21}	—	October 24, 2000	Socorro	LINEAR	·	3.6 km	MPC · JPL
93545	2000 UY_{21}	—	October 24, 2000	Socorro	LINEAR	·	3.5 km	MPC · JPL
93546	2000 UT_{22}	—	October 24, 2000	Socorro	LINEAR	·	5.1 km	MPC · JPL
93547	2000 UC_{23}	—	October 24, 2000	Socorro	LINEAR	·	1.9 km	MPC · JPL
93548	2000 UL_{23}	—	October 24, 2000	Socorro	LINEAR	·	2.5 km	MPC · JPL
93549	2000 UP_{23}	—	October 24, 2000	Socorro	LINEAR	·	4.4 km	MPC · JPL
93550	2000 UY_{23}	—	October 24, 2000	Socorro	LINEAR	RAF	2.2 km	MPC · JPL
93551	2000 UL_{24}	—	October 24, 2000	Socorro	LINEAR	·	3.7 km	MPC · JPL
93552	2000 UO_{25}	—	October 24, 2000	Socorro	LINEAR	·	3.7 km	MPC · JPL
93553	2000 UT_{25}	—	October 24, 2000	Socorro	LINEAR	·	3.7 km	MPC · JPL
93554	2000 UM_{27}	—	October 24, 2000	Socorro	LINEAR	·	2.4 km	MPC · JPL
93555	2000 US_{27}	—	October 24, 2000	Socorro	LINEAR	·	2.5 km	MPC · JPL
93556	2000 UK_{31}	—	October 29, 2000	Kitt Peak	Spacewatch	·	2.6 km	MPC · JPL
93557	2000 UH_{34}	—	October 24, 2000	Socorro	LINEAR	·	4.1 km	MPC · JPL
93558	2000 UJ_{36}	—	October 24, 2000	Socorro	LINEAR	·	2.9 km	MPC · JPL
93559	2000 UA_{37}	—	October 24, 2000	Socorro	LINEAR	·	2.4 km	MPC · JPL
93560	2000 UB_{37}	—	October 24, 2000	Socorro	LINEAR	·	2.0 km	MPC · JPL
93561	2000 UO_{37}	—	October 24, 2000	Socorro	LINEAR	·	5.7 km	MPC · JPL
93562	2000 UW_{37}	—	October 24, 2000	Socorro	LINEAR	·	5.7 km	MPC · JPL
93563	2000 UY_{37}	—	October 24, 2000	Socorro	LINEAR	·	8.0 km	MPC · JPL
93564	2000 UR_{38}	—	October 24, 2000	Socorro	LINEAR	·	3.1 km	MPC · JPL
93565	2000 UB_{39}	—	October 24, 2000	Socorro	LINEAR	·	4.1 km	MPC · JPL
93566	2000 UC_{39}	—	October 24, 2000	Socorro	LINEAR	NEM	4.3 km	MPC · JPL
93567	2000 UD_{39}	—	October 24, 2000	Socorro	LINEAR	·	2.6 km	MPC · JPL
93568	2000 UE_{39}	—	October 24, 2000	Socorro	LINEAR	EUN	3.7 km	MPC · JPL
93569	2000 UG_{39}	—	October 24, 2000	Socorro	LINEAR	HOF	5.7 km	MPC · JPL
93570	2000 UY_{41}	—	October 24, 2000	Socorro	LINEAR	·	3.3 km	MPC · JPL
93571	2000 UP_{42}	—	October 24, 2000	Socorro	LINEAR	·	2.6 km	MPC · JPL
93572	2000 UT_{42}	—	October 24, 2000	Socorro	LINEAR	·	2.8 km	MPC · JPL
93573	2000 UU_{42}	—	October 24, 2000	Socorro	LINEAR	·	3.7 km	MPC · JPL
93574	2000 UG_{43}	—	October 24, 2000	Socorro	LINEAR	·	3.5 km	MPC · JPL
93575	2000 UD_{44}	—	October 24, 2000	Socorro	LINEAR	·	3.3 km	MPC · JPL
93576	2000 UL_{44}	—	October 24, 2000	Socorro	LINEAR	·	2.3 km	MPC · JPL
93577	2000 UA_{46}	—	October 24, 2000	Socorro	LINEAR	·	2.6 km	MPC · JPL
93578	2000 UW_{47}	—	October 24, 2000	Socorro	LINEAR	·	2.6 km	MPC · JPL
93579	2000 UZ_{47}	—	October 24, 2000	Socorro	LINEAR	BRA	4.8 km	MPC · JPL
93580	2000 UC_{48}	—	October 24, 2000	Socorro	LINEAR	·	2.1 km	MPC · JPL
93581	2000 UD_{48}	—	October 24, 2000	Socorro	LINEAR	·	1.9 km	MPC · JPL
93582	2000 UP_{48}	—	October 24, 2000	Socorro	LINEAR	·	2.7 km	MPC · JPL
93583	2000 UC_{51}	—	October 24, 2000	Socorro	LINEAR	·	7.9 km	MPC · JPL
93584	2000 UL_{51}	—	October 24, 2000	Socorro	LINEAR	·	2.6 km	MPC · JPL
93585	2000 UE_{52}	—	October 24, 2000	Socorro	LINEAR	EOS	5.0 km	MPC · JPL
93586	2000 UH_{52}	—	October 24, 2000	Socorro	LINEAR	MAR	2.6 km	MPC · JPL
93587	2000 UJ_{52}	—	October 24, 2000	Socorro	LINEAR	·	3.7 km	MPC · JPL
93588	2000 UO_{52}	—	October 24, 2000	Socorro	LINEAR	·	3.1 km	MPC · JPL
93589	2000 UV_{52}	—	October 24, 2000	Socorro	LINEAR	PAD	4.8 km	MPC · JPL
93590	2000 UY_{52}	—	October 24, 2000	Socorro	LINEAR	·	2.5 km	MPC · JPL
93591	2000 US_{53}	—	October 24, 2000	Socorro	LINEAR	EUN	3.3 km	MPC · JPL
93592	2000 UD_{54}	—	October 24, 2000	Socorro	LINEAR	·	2.1 km	MPC · JPL
93593	2000 UF_{54}	—	October 24, 2000	Socorro	LINEAR	(5)	3.1 km	MPC · JPL
93594	2000 UH_{54}	—	October 24, 2000	Socorro	LINEAR	EUN	2.5 km	MPC · JPL
93595	2000 UZ_{54}	—	October 24, 2000	Socorro	LINEAR	·	5.5 km	MPC · JPL
93596	2000 UN_{55}	—	October 24, 2000	Socorro	LINEAR	·	2.5 km	MPC · JPL
93597	2000 UX_{55}	—	October 24, 2000	Socorro	LINEAR	·	2.4 km	MPC · JPL
93598	2000 UD_{56}	—	October 24, 2000	Socorro	LINEAR	·	6.0 km	MPC · JPL
93599	2000 UA_{57}	—	October 25, 2000	Socorro	LINEAR	·	3.5 km	MPC · JPL
93600	2000 UN_{57}	—	October 25, 2000	Socorro	LINEAR	·	2.9 km	MPC · JPL

== 93601–93700 ==
back to top

Designation			Discovery			Properties		Ref
Permanent	Provisional	Named after	Date	Site	Discoverer(s)	Category	Diam.	Ref
93601	2000 UR_{57}	—	October 25, 2000	Socorro	LINEAR	·	4.4 km	MPC · JPL
93602	2000 UG_{58}	—	October 25, 2000	Socorro	LINEAR	·	3.0 km	MPC · JPL
93603	2000 UO_{58}	—	October 25, 2000	Socorro	LINEAR	·	4.0 km	MPC · JPL
93604	2000 UP_{58}	—	October 25, 2000	Socorro	LINEAR	(5)	2.3 km	MPC · JPL
93605	2000 UR_{58}	—	October 25, 2000	Socorro	LINEAR	·	3.0 km	MPC · JPL
93606	2000 UU_{60}	—	October 25, 2000	Socorro	LINEAR	·	4.8 km	MPC · JPL
93607	2000 UQ_{61}	—	October 25, 2000	Socorro	LINEAR	·	3.3 km	MPC · JPL
93608	2000 UR_{61}	—	October 25, 2000	Socorro	LINEAR	·	2.5 km	MPC · JPL
93609	2000 UX_{61}	—	October 25, 2000	Socorro	LINEAR	·	5.4 km	MPC · JPL
93610	2000 UK_{62}	—	October 25, 2000	Socorro	LINEAR	·	2.7 km	MPC · JPL
93611	2000 UZ_{62}	—	October 25, 2000	Socorro	LINEAR	·	2.2 km	MPC · JPL
93612	2000 UH_{63}	—	October 25, 2000	Socorro	LINEAR	·	2.5 km	MPC · JPL
93613	2000 UL_{64}	—	October 25, 2000	Socorro	LINEAR	·	3.3 km	MPC · JPL
93614	2000 UZ_{65}	—	October 25, 2000	Socorro	LINEAR	·	3.8 km	MPC · JPL
93615	2000 UO_{66}	—	October 25, 2000	Socorro	LINEAR	EUN	2.9 km	MPC · JPL
93616	2000 UW_{66}	—	October 25, 2000	Socorro	LINEAR	·	5.0 km	MPC · JPL
93617	2000 UC_{69}	—	October 25, 2000	Socorro	LINEAR	PAD	5.0 km	MPC · JPL
93618	2000 UL_{69}	—	October 25, 2000	Socorro	LINEAR	·	2.4 km	MPC · JPL
93619	2000 UR_{69}	—	October 25, 2000	Socorro	LINEAR	(5)	1.7 km	MPC · JPL
93620	2000 UQ_{70}	—	October 25, 2000	Socorro	LINEAR	·	2.6 km	MPC · JPL
93621	2000 UZ_{70}	—	October 25, 2000	Socorro	LINEAR	·	4.8 km	MPC · JPL
93622	2000 UJ_{71}	—	October 25, 2000	Socorro	LINEAR	·	3.3 km	MPC · JPL
93623	2000 UC_{73}	—	October 25, 2000	Socorro	LINEAR	·	3.5 km	MPC · JPL
93624	2000 UP_{73}	—	October 26, 2000	Socorro	LINEAR	·	2.8 km	MPC · JPL
93625	2000 UU_{73}	—	October 26, 2000	Socorro	LINEAR	·	2.2 km	MPC · JPL
93626	2000 UV_{73}	—	October 26, 2000	Socorro	LINEAR	·	4.1 km	MPC · JPL
93627	2000 UK_{74}	—	October 29, 2000	Socorro	LINEAR	·	3.9 km	MPC · JPL
93628	2000 UF_{75}	—	October 31, 2000	Socorro	LINEAR	·	3.4 km	MPC · JPL
93629	2000 UH_{77}	—	October 24, 2000	Socorro	LINEAR	·	2.6 km	MPC · JPL
93630	2000 UR_{77}	—	October 24, 2000	Socorro	LINEAR	WIT	2.0 km	MPC · JPL
93631	2000 UV_{78}	—	October 24, 2000	Socorro	LINEAR	EOS	4.8 km	MPC · JPL
93632	2000 UE_{79}	—	October 24, 2000	Socorro	LINEAR	KOR	2.9 km	MPC · JPL
93633	2000 UF_{79}	—	October 24, 2000	Socorro	LINEAR	·	5.2 km	MPC · JPL
93634	2000 UP_{79}	—	October 24, 2000	Socorro	LINEAR	·	4.1 km	MPC · JPL
93635	2000 UR_{80}	—	October 24, 2000	Socorro	LINEAR	PAD	4.4 km	MPC · JPL
93636	2000 UF_{81}	—	October 24, 2000	Socorro	LINEAR	·	3.8 km	MPC · JPL
93637	2000 UM_{81}	—	October 24, 2000	Socorro	LINEAR	·	5.1 km	MPC · JPL
93638	2000 UP_{81}	—	October 24, 2000	Socorro	LINEAR	·	4.6 km	MPC · JPL
93639	2000 UQ_{86}	—	October 31, 2000	Socorro	LINEAR	·	5.0 km	MPC · JPL
93640	2000 UU_{86}	—	October 31, 2000	Socorro	LINEAR	·	3.8 km	MPC · JPL
93641	2000 US_{88}	—	October 31, 2000	Socorro	LINEAR	·	3.0 km	MPC · JPL
93642	2000 UA_{89}	—	October 31, 2000	Socorro	LINEAR	AGN	2.2 km	MPC · JPL
93643	2000 UK_{89}	—	October 31, 2000	Socorro	LINEAR	·	2.8 km	MPC · JPL
93644	2000 UE_{90}	—	October 24, 2000	Socorro	LINEAR	·	2.6 km	MPC · JPL
93645	2000 UF_{90}	—	October 24, 2000	Socorro	LINEAR	·	3.7 km	MPC · JPL
93646	2000 UR_{90}	—	October 24, 2000	Socorro	LINEAR	·	2.8 km	MPC · JPL
93647	2000 UK_{91}	—	October 25, 2000	Socorro	LINEAR	·	3.2 km	MPC · JPL
93648	2000 UH_{92}	—	October 25, 2000	Socorro	LINEAR	·	2.8 km	MPC · JPL
93649	2000 UA_{94}	—	October 25, 2000	Socorro	LINEAR	·	2.7 km	MPC · JPL
93650	2000 UQ_{94}	—	October 25, 2000	Socorro	LINEAR	RAF	2.1 km	MPC · JPL
93651	2000 UU_{94}	—	October 25, 2000	Socorro	LINEAR	KON	4.8 km	MPC · JPL
93652	2000 UW_{97}	—	October 25, 2000	Socorro	LINEAR	·	3.5 km	MPC · JPL
93653	2000 UL_{98}	—	October 25, 2000	Socorro	LINEAR	WIT	2.8 km	MPC · JPL
93654	2000 UX_{98}	—	October 25, 2000	Socorro	LINEAR	·	5.0 km	MPC · JPL
93655	2000 UT_{99}	—	October 25, 2000	Socorro	LINEAR	·	4.5 km	MPC · JPL
93656	2000 UW_{99}	—	October 25, 2000	Socorro	LINEAR	(5)	2.5 km	MPC · JPL
93657	2000 UN_{100}	—	October 25, 2000	Socorro	LINEAR	·	3.8 km	MPC · JPL
93658	2000 UU_{103}	—	October 25, 2000	Socorro	LINEAR	·	3.9 km	MPC · JPL
93659	2000 UF_{104}	—	October 25, 2000	Socorro	LINEAR	·	3.8 km	MPC · JPL
93660	2000 UH_{104}	—	October 25, 2000	Socorro	LINEAR	·	3.8 km	MPC · JPL
93661	2000 UQ_{104}	—	October 25, 2000	Socorro	LINEAR	·	4.2 km	MPC · JPL
93662	2000 UD_{105}	—	October 29, 2000	Socorro	LINEAR	·	2.5 km	MPC · JPL
93663	2000 UX_{105}	—	October 29, 2000	Socorro	LINEAR	·	2.4 km	MPC · JPL
93664	2000 UJ_{106}	—	October 30, 2000	Socorro	LINEAR	·	3.5 km	MPC · JPL
93665	2000 US_{108}	—	October 31, 2000	Socorro	LINEAR	·	3.0 km	MPC · JPL
93666	2000 UL_{109}	—	October 31, 2000	Socorro	LINEAR	·	3.5 km	MPC · JPL
93667	2000 UM_{109}	—	October 31, 2000	Socorro	LINEAR	·	5.9 km	MPC · JPL
93668	2000 UA_{110}	—	October 31, 2000	Socorro	LINEAR	·	12 km	MPC · JPL
93669	2000 UV_{111}	—	October 29, 2000	Kitt Peak	Spacewatch	·	3.4 km	MPC · JPL
93670	2000 UC_{112}	—	October 29, 2000	Kitt Peak	Spacewatch	·	2.6 km	MPC · JPL
93671	2000 UQ_{112}	—	October 24, 2000	Socorro	LINEAR	MIS	4.1 km	MPC · JPL
93672	2000 UY_{112}	—	October 19, 2000	Kitt Peak	Spacewatch	·	3.1 km	MPC · JPL
93673	2000 UR_{113}	—	October 18, 2000	Socorro	LINEAR	HNS	3.4 km	MPC · JPL
93674	2000 VZ_{3}	—	November 1, 2000	Socorro	LINEAR	·	2.1 km	MPC · JPL
93675	2000 VR_{5}	—	November 1, 2000	Socorro	LINEAR	·	4.5 km	MPC · JPL
93676	2000 VX_{5}	—	November 1, 2000	Socorro	LINEAR	EUN	2.5 km	MPC · JPL
93677	2000 VD_{6}	—	November 1, 2000	Socorro	LINEAR	·	2.4 km	MPC · JPL
93678	2000 VJ_{6}	—	November 1, 2000	Socorro	LINEAR	·	3.4 km	MPC · JPL
93679	2000 VO_{11}	—	November 1, 2000	Socorro	LINEAR	·	6.5 km	MPC · JPL
93680	2000 VC_{12}	—	November 1, 2000	Socorro	LINEAR	·	3.2 km	MPC · JPL
93681	2000 VZ_{13}	—	November 1, 2000	Socorro	LINEAR	·	2.8 km	MPC · JPL
93682	2000 VM_{14}	—	November 1, 2000	Socorro	LINEAR	·	2.5 km	MPC · JPL
93683	2000 VN_{14}	—	November 1, 2000	Socorro	LINEAR	·	2.8 km	MPC · JPL
93684	2000 VC_{15}	—	November 1, 2000	Socorro	LINEAR	·	2.6 km	MPC · JPL
93685	2000 VG_{15}	—	November 1, 2000	Socorro	LINEAR	·	3.2 km	MPC · JPL
93686	2000 VB_{17}	—	November 1, 2000	Socorro	LINEAR	·	3.3 km	MPC · JPL
93687	2000 VH_{18}	—	November 1, 2000	Socorro	LINEAR	(5)	3.2 km	MPC · JPL
93688	2000 VG_{20}	—	November 1, 2000	Socorro	LINEAR	HOF	5.6 km	MPC · JPL
93689	2000 VT_{20}	—	November 1, 2000	Socorro	LINEAR	·	2.9 km	MPC · JPL
93690	2000 VE_{21}	—	November 1, 2000	Socorro	LINEAR	KOR	2.4 km	MPC · JPL
93691	2000 VJ_{21}	—	November 1, 2000	Socorro	LINEAR	·	3.3 km	MPC · JPL
93692	2000 VK_{21}	—	November 1, 2000	Socorro	LINEAR	·	3.0 km	MPC · JPL
93693	2000 VC_{23}	—	November 1, 2000	Socorro	LINEAR	·	4.5 km	MPC · JPL
93694	2000 VD_{23}	—	November 1, 2000	Socorro	LINEAR	·	2.9 km	MPC · JPL
93695	2000 VU_{24}	—	November 1, 2000	Socorro	LINEAR	WAT	4.7 km	MPC · JPL
93696	2000 VV_{25}	—	November 1, 2000	Socorro	LINEAR	·	3.5 km	MPC · JPL
93697	2000 VH_{26}	—	November 1, 2000	Socorro	LINEAR	·	2.5 km	MPC · JPL
93698	2000 VM_{26}	—	November 1, 2000	Socorro	LINEAR	AGN	1.9 km	MPC · JPL
93699	2000 VP_{26}	—	November 1, 2000	Socorro	LINEAR	·	3.4 km	MPC · JPL
93700	2000 VT_{26}	—	November 1, 2000	Socorro	LINEAR	·	3.8 km	MPC · JPL

== 93701–93800 ==
back to top

Designation			Discovery			Properties		Ref
Permanent	Provisional	Named after	Date	Site	Discoverer(s)	Category	Diam.	Ref
93701	2000 VM_{27}	—	November 1, 2000	Socorro	LINEAR	·	2.4 km	MPC · JPL
93702	2000 VU_{27}	—	November 1, 2000	Socorro	LINEAR	(5)	2.2 km	MPC · JPL
93703	2000 VZ_{27}	—	November 1, 2000	Socorro	LINEAR	(5)	2.7 km	MPC · JPL
93704	2000 VP_{28}	—	November 1, 2000	Socorro	LINEAR	RAF	2.2 km	MPC · JPL
93705	2000 VP_{30}	—	November 1, 2000	Socorro	LINEAR	·	3.0 km	MPC · JPL
93706	2000 VQ_{30}	—	November 1, 2000	Socorro	LINEAR	·	3.4 km	MPC · JPL
93707	2000 VP_{31}	—	November 1, 2000	Socorro	LINEAR	·	2.8 km	MPC · JPL
93708	2000 VR_{31}	—	November 1, 2000	Socorro	LINEAR	·	3.2 km	MPC · JPL
93709	2000 VW_{31}	—	November 1, 2000	Socorro	LINEAR	·	3.2 km	MPC · JPL
93710	2000 VR_{33}	—	November 1, 2000	Socorro	LINEAR	·	3.1 km	MPC · JPL
93711	2000 VX_{33}	—	November 1, 2000	Socorro	LINEAR	·	5.4 km	MPC · JPL
93712	2000 VU_{34}	—	November 1, 2000	Socorro	LINEAR	·	4.5 km	MPC · JPL
93713	2000 VH_{35}	—	November 1, 2000	Socorro	LINEAR	·	4.0 km	MPC · JPL
93714	2000 VJ_{35}	—	November 1, 2000	Socorro	LINEAR	·	3.2 km	MPC · JPL
93715	2000 VN_{35}	—	November 1, 2000	Socorro	LINEAR	·	3.0 km	MPC · JPL
93716	2000 VP_{35}	—	November 1, 2000	Socorro	LINEAR	·	6.5 km	MPC · JPL
93717	2000 VE_{36}	—	November 1, 2000	Socorro	LINEAR	·	7.9 km	MPC · JPL
93718	2000 VO_{36}	—	November 1, 2000	Socorro	LINEAR	·	3.9 km	MPC · JPL
93719	2000 VR_{36}	—	November 1, 2000	Socorro	LINEAR	·	5.1 km	MPC · JPL
93720	2000 VY_{37}	—	November 1, 2000	Socorro	LINEAR	·	6.8 km	MPC · JPL
93721	2000 VN_{39}	—	November 1, 2000	Socorro	LINEAR	·	2.2 km	MPC · JPL
93722	2000 VE_{40}	—	November 1, 2000	Socorro	LINEAR	·	2.5 km	MPC · JPL
93723	2000 VF_{40}	—	November 1, 2000	Socorro	LINEAR	(5)	2.2 km	MPC · JPL
93724	2000 VX_{40}	—	November 1, 2000	Socorro	LINEAR	·	2.1 km	MPC · JPL
93725	2000 VF_{41}	—	November 1, 2000	Socorro	LINEAR	·	2.7 km	MPC · JPL
93726	2000 VZ_{41}	—	November 1, 2000	Socorro	LINEAR	·	3.4 km	MPC · JPL
93727	2000 VX_{42}	—	November 1, 2000	Socorro	LINEAR	·	2.8 km	MPC · JPL
93728	2000 VX_{43}	—	November 1, 2000	Socorro	LINEAR	·	3.1 km	MPC · JPL
93729	2000 VK_{44}	—	November 2, 2000	Socorro	LINEAR	EUN	2.1 km	MPC · JPL
93730	2000 VB_{46}	—	November 2, 2000	Socorro	LINEAR	·	3.9 km	MPC · JPL
93731	2000 VT_{46}	—	November 3, 2000	Socorro	LINEAR	EOS	3.6 km	MPC · JPL
93732	2000 VE_{47}	—	November 3, 2000	Socorro	LINEAR	·	7.1 km	MPC · JPL
93733	2000 VJ_{47}	—	November 3, 2000	Socorro	LINEAR	·	9.6 km	MPC · JPL
93734	2000 VS_{47}	—	November 1, 2000	Socorro	LINEAR	AST	3.3 km	MPC · JPL
93735	2000 VO_{48}	—	November 2, 2000	Socorro	LINEAR	·	3.4 km	MPC · JPL
93736	2000 VL_{50}	—	November 2, 2000	Socorro	LINEAR	·	3.4 km	MPC · JPL
93737	2000 VP_{50}	—	November 2, 2000	Socorro	LINEAR	ADE	6.4 km	MPC · JPL
93738	2000 VQ_{50}	—	November 2, 2000	Socorro	LINEAR	slow	4.3 km	MPC · JPL
93739	2000 VK_{51}	—	November 3, 2000	Socorro	LINEAR	·	3.2 km	MPC · JPL
93740	2000 VO_{51}	—	November 3, 2000	Socorro	LINEAR	·	3.0 km	MPC · JPL
93741	2000 VV_{55}	—	November 3, 2000	Socorro	LINEAR	·	4.5 km	MPC · JPL
93742	2000 VH_{56}	—	November 3, 2000	Socorro	LINEAR	·	3.1 km	MPC · JPL
93743	2000 VX_{56}	—	November 3, 2000	Socorro	LINEAR	·	4.6 km	MPC · JPL
93744	2000 VM_{57}	—	November 3, 2000	Socorro	LINEAR	EUN	2.8 km	MPC · JPL
93745	2000 VQ_{57}	—	November 3, 2000	Socorro	LINEAR	·	4.6 km	MPC · JPL
93746	2000 VU_{57}	—	November 3, 2000	Socorro	LINEAR	·	2.7 km	MPC · JPL
93747	2000 VG_{58}	—	November 3, 2000	Socorro	LINEAR	·	2.2 km	MPC · JPL
93748	2000 VO_{61}	—	November 9, 2000	Socorro	LINEAR	·	3.5 km	MPC · JPL
93749	2000 VP_{62}	—	November 2, 2000	Socorro	LINEAR	·	3.0 km	MPC · JPL
93750	2000 WF_{1}	—	November 17, 2000	Socorro	LINEAR	·	6.2 km	MPC · JPL
93751	2000 WH_{1}	—	November 17, 2000	Socorro	LINEAR	·	3.7 km	MPC · JPL
93752	2000 WA_{5}	—	November 19, 2000	Socorro	LINEAR	·	3.3 km	MPC · JPL
93753	2000 WO_{5}	—	November 19, 2000	Socorro	LINEAR	·	2.3 km	MPC · JPL
93754	2000 WZ_{6}	—	November 19, 2000	Socorro	LINEAR	EOS	5.0 km	MPC · JPL
93755	2000 WC_{7}	—	November 19, 2000	Socorro	LINEAR	·	6.4 km	MPC · JPL
93756	2000 WZ_{8}	—	November 19, 2000	Desert Beaver	W. K. Y. Yeung	(5) · slow	4.0 km	MPC · JPL
93757	2000 WE_{14}	—	November 20, 2000	Socorro	LINEAR	LIX	7.7 km	MPC · JPL
93758	2000 WE_{16}	—	November 21, 2000	Socorro	LINEAR	·	2.9 km	MPC · JPL
93759	2000 WK_{16}	—	November 21, 2000	Socorro	LINEAR	KOR	2.7 km	MPC · JPL
93760	2000 WP_{17}	—	November 21, 2000	Socorro	LINEAR	KOR	3.1 km	MPC · JPL
93761	2000 WT_{17}	—	November 21, 2000	Socorro	LINEAR	KOR	2.9 km	MPC · JPL
93762	2000 WB_{18}	—	November 21, 2000	Socorro	LINEAR	·	2.4 km	MPC · JPL
93763	2000 WH_{19}	—	November 25, 2000	Fountain Hills	C. W. Juels	·	2.6 km	MPC · JPL
93764	2000 WC_{20}	—	November 23, 2000	Kitt Peak	Spacewatch	·	5.5 km	MPC · JPL
93765	2000 WB_{21}	—	November 25, 2000	Kitt Peak	Spacewatch	MRX	2.7 km	MPC · JPL
93766	2000 WL_{21}	—	November 25, 2000	Socorro	LINEAR	HNS	2.5 km	MPC · JPL
93767	2000 WM_{21}	—	November 21, 2000	Needville	Needville	·	4.3 km	MPC · JPL
93768	2000 WN_{22}	—	November 20, 2000	Socorro	LINEAR	·	3.1 km	MPC · JPL
93769	2000 WO_{23}	—	November 20, 2000	Socorro	LINEAR	·	2.3 km	MPC · JPL
93770	2000 WX_{23}	—	November 20, 2000	Socorro	LINEAR	AGN	2.2 km	MPC · JPL
93771	2000 WL_{24}	—	November 20, 2000	Socorro	LINEAR	·	4.3 km	MPC · JPL
93772	2000 WH_{25}	—	November 21, 2000	Socorro	LINEAR	·	4.9 km	MPC · JPL
93773	2000 WL_{25}	—	November 21, 2000	Socorro	LINEAR	·	4.5 km	MPC · JPL
93774	2000 WV_{25}	—	November 21, 2000	Socorro	LINEAR	KOR	2.8 km	MPC · JPL
93775	2000 WY_{25}	—	November 21, 2000	Socorro	LINEAR	·	2.5 km	MPC · JPL
93776	2000 WW_{26}	—	November 25, 2000	Socorro	LINEAR	(18466)	3.1 km	MPC · JPL
93777	2000 WE_{30}	—	November 20, 2000	Socorro	LINEAR	·	3.3 km	MPC · JPL
93778	2000 WN_{30}	—	November 20, 2000	Socorro	LINEAR	·	2.5 km	MPC · JPL
93779	2000 WT_{30}	—	November 20, 2000	Socorro	LINEAR	·	5.7 km	MPC · JPL
93780	2000 WV_{30}	—	November 20, 2000	Socorro	LINEAR	·	2.6 km	MPC · JPL
93781	2000 WZ_{31}	—	November 20, 2000	Socorro	LINEAR	EOS	4.5 km	MPC · JPL
93782	2000 WW_{32}	—	November 20, 2000	Socorro	LINEAR	·	3.4 km	MPC · JPL
93783	2000 WM_{33}	—	November 20, 2000	Socorro	LINEAR	·	2.6 km	MPC · JPL
93784	2000 WX_{33}	—	November 20, 2000	Socorro	LINEAR	(5)	4.5 km	MPC · JPL
93785	2000 WZ_{33}	—	November 20, 2000	Socorro	LINEAR	·	2.9 km	MPC · JPL
93786	2000 WS_{34}	—	November 20, 2000	Socorro	LINEAR	·	4.7 km	MPC · JPL
93787	2000 WE_{35}	—	November 20, 2000	Socorro	LINEAR	EOS	3.7 km	MPC · JPL
93788	2000 WH_{35}	—	November 20, 2000	Socorro	LINEAR	·	3.4 km	MPC · JPL
93789	2000 WJ_{35}	—	November 20, 2000	Socorro	LINEAR	·	3.7 km	MPC · JPL
93790	2000 WL_{37}	—	November 20, 2000	Socorro	LINEAR	·	3.3 km	MPC · JPL
93791	2000 WU_{38}	—	November 20, 2000	Socorro	LINEAR	EOS	3.8 km	MPC · JPL
93792	2000 WL_{40}	—	November 20, 2000	Socorro	LINEAR	·	4.8 km	MPC · JPL
93793	2000 WL_{41}	—	November 20, 2000	Socorro	LINEAR	ADE	6.1 km	MPC · JPL
93794	2000 WW_{42}	—	November 21, 2000	Socorro	LINEAR	AGN	2.5 km	MPC · JPL
93795	2000 WB_{43}	—	November 21, 2000	Socorro	LINEAR	·	3.4 km	MPC · JPL
93796	2000 WG_{43}	—	November 21, 2000	Socorro	LINEAR	EOS	4.2 km	MPC · JPL
93797	2000 WO_{43}	—	November 21, 2000	Socorro	LINEAR	·	2.5 km	MPC · JPL
93798	2000 WP_{45}	—	November 21, 2000	Socorro	LINEAR	·	4.8 km	MPC · JPL
93799	2000 WN_{46}	—	November 21, 2000	Socorro	LINEAR	·	2.4 km	MPC · JPL
93800	2000 WR_{46}	—	November 21, 2000	Socorro	LINEAR	·	2.1 km	MPC · JPL

== 93801–93900 ==
back to top

Designation			Discovery			Properties		Ref
Permanent	Provisional	Named after	Date	Site	Discoverer(s)	Category	Diam.	Ref
93801	2000 WM_{48}	—	November 21, 2000	Socorro	LINEAR	·	2.6 km	MPC · JPL
93802	2000 WW_{48}	—	November 21, 2000	Socorro	LINEAR	·	9.9 km	MPC · JPL
93803	2000 WL_{49}	—	November 21, 2000	Socorro	LINEAR	·	7.5 km	MPC · JPL
93804	2000 WU_{49}	—	November 25, 2000	Socorro	LINEAR	·	4.1 km	MPC · JPL
93805	2000 WT_{50}	—	November 26, 2000	Desert Beaver	W. K. Y. Yeung	KOR	2.8 km	MPC · JPL
93806	2000 WD_{54}	—	November 20, 2000	Socorro	LINEAR	·	2.3 km	MPC · JPL
93807	2000 WF_{55}	—	November 20, 2000	Socorro	LINEAR	(5)	3.4 km	MPC · JPL
93808	2000 WL_{55}	—	November 20, 2000	Socorro	LINEAR	EOS	3.9 km	MPC · JPL
93809	2000 WK_{56}	—	November 21, 2000	Socorro	LINEAR	·	3.7 km	MPC · JPL
93810	2000 WB_{57}	—	November 21, 2000	Socorro	LINEAR	·	4.8 km	MPC · JPL
93811	2000 WV_{57}	—	November 21, 2000	Socorro	LINEAR	(5)	2.4 km	MPC · JPL
93812	2000 WH_{59}	—	November 21, 2000	Socorro	LINEAR	·	5.2 km	MPC · JPL
93813	2000 WB_{60}	—	November 21, 2000	Socorro	LINEAR	EUN	3.0 km	MPC · JPL
93814	2000 WJ_{60}	—	November 21, 2000	Socorro	LINEAR	EOS	5.9 km	MPC · JPL
93815	2000 WM_{60}	—	November 21, 2000	Socorro	LINEAR	·	3.0 km	MPC · JPL
93816	2000 WJ_{61}	—	November 21, 2000	Socorro	LINEAR	·	3.3 km	MPC · JPL
93817	2000 WQ_{61}	—	November 21, 2000	Socorro	LINEAR	·	9.2 km	MPC · JPL
93818	2000 WL_{62}	—	November 23, 2000	Haleakala	NEAT	EUN	2.6 km	MPC · JPL
93819	2000 WG_{69}	—	November 19, 2000	Socorro	LINEAR	·	3.0 km	MPC · JPL
93820	2000 WN_{70}	—	November 19, 2000	Socorro	LINEAR	·	3.0 km	MPC · JPL
93821	2000 WF_{71}	—	November 19, 2000	Socorro	LINEAR	·	4.2 km	MPC · JPL
93822	2000 WR_{71}	—	November 19, 2000	Socorro	LINEAR	·	3.8 km	MPC · JPL
93823	2000 WU_{72}	—	November 20, 2000	Socorro	LINEAR	HOF	5.4 km	MPC · JPL
93824	2000 WW_{72}	—	November 20, 2000	Socorro	LINEAR	·	2.9 km	MPC · JPL
93825	2000 WA_{74}	—	November 20, 2000	Socorro	LINEAR	·	4.5 km	MPC · JPL
93826	2000 WG_{74}	—	November 20, 2000	Socorro	LINEAR	·	4.2 km	MPC · JPL
93827	2000 WR_{75}	—	November 20, 2000	Socorro	LINEAR	·	3.8 km	MPC · JPL
93828	2000 WJ_{76}	—	November 20, 2000	Socorro	LINEAR	·	2.6 km	MPC · JPL
93829	2000 WZ_{76}	—	November 20, 2000	Socorro	LINEAR	fast	5.9 km	MPC · JPL
93830	2000 WE_{77}	—	November 20, 2000	Socorro	LINEAR	slow	3.2 km	MPC · JPL
93831	2000 WL_{77}	—	November 20, 2000	Socorro	LINEAR	·	4.8 km	MPC · JPL
93832	2000 WU_{77}	—	November 20, 2000	Socorro	LINEAR	·	7.2 km	MPC · JPL
93833	2000 WL_{78}	—	November 20, 2000	Socorro	LINEAR	HOF	5.9 km	MPC · JPL
93834	2000 WR_{79}	—	November 20, 2000	Socorro	LINEAR	·	3.7 km	MPC · JPL
93835	2000 WG_{80}	—	November 20, 2000	Socorro	LINEAR	·	2.9 km	MPC · JPL
93836	2000 WO_{80}	—	November 20, 2000	Socorro	LINEAR	·	5.4 km	MPC · JPL
93837	2000 WW_{82}	—	November 20, 2000	Socorro	LINEAR	(5)	2.8 km	MPC · JPL
93838	2000 WA_{84}	—	November 20, 2000	Socorro	LINEAR	·	3.0 km	MPC · JPL
93839	2000 WW_{84}	—	November 20, 2000	Socorro	LINEAR	·	3.8 km	MPC · JPL
93840	2000 WT_{85}	—	November 20, 2000	Socorro	LINEAR	KOR	2.2 km	MPC · JPL
93841	2000 WJ_{87}	—	November 20, 2000	Socorro	LINEAR	·	8.0 km	MPC · JPL
93842	2000 WU_{87}	—	November 20, 2000	Socorro	LINEAR	·	3.1 km	MPC · JPL
93843	2000 WS_{89}	—	November 21, 2000	Socorro	LINEAR	KOR	3.1 km	MPC · JPL
93844	2000 WC_{90}	—	November 21, 2000	Socorro	LINEAR	KOR	2.9 km	MPC · JPL
93845	2000 WF_{90}	—	November 21, 2000	Socorro	LINEAR	·	3.8 km	MPC · JPL
93846	2000 WW_{91}	—	November 21, 2000	Socorro	LINEAR	(12739)	5.0 km	MPC · JPL
93847	2000 WF_{92}	—	November 21, 2000	Socorro	LINEAR	·	2.4 km	MPC · JPL
93848	2000 WX_{92}	—	November 21, 2000	Socorro	LINEAR	·	4.2 km	MPC · JPL
93849	2000 WZ_{93}	—	November 21, 2000	Socorro	LINEAR	·	2.7 km	MPC · JPL
93850	2000 WJ_{94}	—	November 21, 2000	Socorro	LINEAR	·	3.6 km	MPC · JPL
93851	2000 WE_{96}	—	November 21, 2000	Socorro	LINEAR	EOS	4.7 km	MPC · JPL
93852	2000 WS_{96}	—	November 21, 2000	Socorro	LINEAR	·	4.4 km	MPC · JPL
93853	2000 WW_{96}	—	November 21, 2000	Socorro	LINEAR	·	5.1 km	MPC · JPL
93854	2000 WH_{97}	—	November 21, 2000	Socorro	LINEAR	EOS	5.5 km	MPC · JPL
93855	2000 WU_{97}	—	November 21, 2000	Socorro	LINEAR	·	3.6 km	MPC · JPL
93856	2000 WL_{99}	—	November 21, 2000	Socorro	LINEAR	·	4.8 km	MPC · JPL
93857	2000 WV_{102}	—	November 26, 2000	Socorro	LINEAR	·	3.0 km	MPC · JPL
93858	2000 WJ_{103}	—	November 26, 2000	Socorro	LINEAR	ADE	6.8 km	MPC · JPL
93859	2000 WM_{109}	—	November 20, 2000	Socorro	LINEAR	·	3.2 km	MPC · JPL
93860	2000 WH_{110}	—	November 20, 2000	Socorro	LINEAR	EUN	3.8 km	MPC · JPL
93861	2000 WP_{111}	—	November 20, 2000	Socorro	LINEAR	EOS	4.4 km	MPC · JPL
93862	2000 WD_{113}	—	November 20, 2000	Socorro	LINEAR	·	4.4 km	MPC · JPL
93863	2000 WL_{113}	—	November 20, 2000	Socorro	LINEAR	·	6.8 km	MPC · JPL
93864	2000 WS_{113}	—	November 20, 2000	Socorro	LINEAR	EOS	3.7 km	MPC · JPL
93865	2000 WV_{113}	—	November 20, 2000	Socorro	LINEAR	·	3.9 km	MPC · JPL
93866	2000 WK_{115}	—	November 20, 2000	Socorro	LINEAR	·	4.9 km	MPC · JPL
93867	2000 WQ_{115}	—	November 20, 2000	Socorro	LINEAR	MAR	3.7 km	MPC · JPL
93868	2000 WL_{116}	—	November 20, 2000	Socorro	LINEAR	·	5.1 km	MPC · JPL
93869	2000 WZ_{119}	—	November 20, 2000	Socorro	LINEAR	EUN	4.5 km	MPC · JPL
93870	2000 WW_{120}	—	November 20, 2000	Socorro	LINEAR	slow	3.7 km	MPC · JPL
93871	2000 WZ_{120}	—	November 20, 2000	Socorro	LINEAR	EUN	3.5 km	MPC · JPL
93872	2000 WB_{122}	—	November 29, 2000	Socorro	LINEAR	·	3.2 km	MPC · JPL
93873	2000 WC_{122}	—	November 29, 2000	Socorro	LINEAR	HOF	5.1 km	MPC · JPL
93874	2000 WX_{124}	—	November 27, 2000	Haleakala	NEAT	·	3.7 km	MPC · JPL
93875	2000 WW_{125}	—	November 30, 2000	Socorro	LINEAR	·	3.3 km	MPC · JPL
93876	2000 WZ_{125}	—	November 30, 2000	Socorro	LINEAR	·	2.1 km	MPC · JPL
93877	2000 WS_{127}	—	November 17, 2000	Kitt Peak	Spacewatch	·	2.7 km	MPC · JPL
93878	2000 WK_{128}	—	November 18, 2000	Kitt Peak	Spacewatch	NEM	3.8 km	MPC · JPL
93879	2000 WQ_{128}	—	November 18, 2000	Kitt Peak	Spacewatch	KOR	2.7 km	MPC · JPL
93880	2000 WV_{128}	—	November 19, 2000	Kitt Peak	Spacewatch	HOF	4.1 km	MPC · JPL
93881	2000 WJ_{129}	—	November 19, 2000	Kitt Peak	Spacewatch	KOR	2.4 km	MPC · JPL
93882	2000 WA_{130}	—	November 19, 2000	Desert Beaver	W. K. Y. Yeung	·	8.4 km	MPC · JPL
93883	2000 WN_{130}	—	November 20, 2000	Anderson Mesa	LONEOS	EUN	2.6 km	MPC · JPL
93884	2000 WZ_{130}	—	November 20, 2000	Anderson Mesa	LONEOS	·	3.6 km	MPC · JPL
93885	2000 WO_{132}	—	November 19, 2000	Socorro	LINEAR	·	5.4 km	MPC · JPL
93886	2000 WB_{135}	—	November 19, 2000	Socorro	LINEAR	·	2.7 km	MPC · JPL
93887	2000 WY_{135}	—	November 20, 2000	Socorro	LINEAR	·	2.1 km	MPC · JPL
93888	2000 WP_{136}	—	November 20, 2000	Socorro	LINEAR	·	2.8 km	MPC · JPL
93889	2000 WQ_{136}	—	November 20, 2000	Socorro	LINEAR	·	3.0 km	MPC · JPL
93890	2000 WV_{136}	—	November 20, 2000	Socorro	LINEAR	·	3.4 km	MPC · JPL
93891	2000 WB_{137}	—	November 20, 2000	Anderson Mesa	LONEOS	MAR	3.1 km	MPC · JPL
93892	2000 WF_{141}	—	November 19, 2000	Socorro	LINEAR	·	7.7 km	MPC · JPL
93893	2000 WL_{141}	—	November 19, 2000	Socorro	LINEAR	·	4.5 km	MPC · JPL
93894	2000 WM_{141}	—	November 19, 2000	Socorro	LINEAR	slow	6.5 km	MPC · JPL
93895	2000 WX_{141}	—	November 20, 2000	Anderson Mesa	LONEOS	·	3.8 km	MPC · JPL
93896	2000 WY_{141}	—	November 20, 2000	Anderson Mesa	LONEOS	·	4.2 km	MPC · JPL
93897	2000 WD_{143}	—	November 20, 2000	Anderson Mesa	LONEOS	EUN	2.8 km	MPC · JPL
93898	2000 WO_{143}	—	November 20, 2000	Socorro	LINEAR	·	2.8 km	MPC · JPL
93899	2000 WL_{145}	—	November 22, 2000	Haleakala	NEAT	·	2.0 km	MPC · JPL
93900	2000 WS_{146}	—	November 24, 2000	Anderson Mesa	LONEOS	·	2.7 km	MPC · JPL

== 93901–94000 ==
back to top

Designation			Discovery			Properties		Ref
Permanent	Provisional	Named after	Date	Site	Discoverer(s)	Category	Diam.	Ref
93901	2000 WN_{147}	—	November 28, 2000	Kitt Peak	Spacewatch	·	4.8 km	MPC · JPL
93902	2000 WT_{148}	—	November 28, 2000	Haleakala	NEAT	·	3.5 km	MPC · JPL
93903	2000 WT_{149}	—	November 28, 2000	Kitt Peak	Spacewatch	·	4.2 km	MPC · JPL
93904	2000 WY_{150}	—	November 19, 2000	Socorro	LINEAR	HNS	2.7 km	MPC · JPL
93905	2000 WX_{151}	—	November 29, 2000	Haleakala	NEAT	EUN	2.2 km	MPC · JPL
93906	2000 WJ_{153}	—	November 29, 2000	Socorro	LINEAR	·	7.4 km	MPC · JPL
93907	2000 WW_{153}	—	November 30, 2000	Socorro	LINEAR	PHO	3.2 km	MPC · JPL
93908	2000 WE_{154}	—	November 30, 2000	Socorro	LINEAR	·	2.2 km	MPC · JPL
93909	2000 WF_{154}	—	November 30, 2000	Socorro	LINEAR	·	3.8 km	MPC · JPL
93910	2000 WZ_{155}	—	November 30, 2000	Socorro	LINEAR	ADE	7.5 km	MPC · JPL
93911	2000 WF_{156}	—	November 30, 2000	Socorro	LINEAR	·	5.5 km	MPC · JPL
93912	2000 WE_{157}	—	November 30, 2000	Socorro	LINEAR	·	2.2 km	MPC · JPL
93913	2000 WO_{157}	—	November 30, 2000	Socorro	LINEAR	·	3.8 km	MPC · JPL
93914	2000 WV_{157}	—	November 30, 2000	Socorro	LINEAR	·	5.0 km	MPC · JPL
93915	2000 WX_{157}	—	November 30, 2000	Socorro	LINEAR	·	6.9 km	MPC · JPL
93916	2000 WG_{158}	—	November 30, 2000	Socorro	LINEAR	·	3.4 km	MPC · JPL
93917	2000 WV_{158}	—	November 30, 2000	Haleakala	NEAT	·	6.1 km	MPC · JPL
93918	2000 WW_{159}	—	November 20, 2000	Anderson Mesa	LONEOS	·	5.4 km	MPC · JPL
93919	2000 WJ_{160}	—	November 20, 2000	Anderson Mesa	LONEOS	·	3.7 km	MPC · JPL
93920	2000 WN_{160}	—	November 20, 2000	Socorro	LINEAR	·	4.5 km	MPC · JPL
93921	2000 WQ_{160}	—	November 20, 2000	Socorro	LINEAR	EUN	2.6 km	MPC · JPL
93922	2000 WF_{161}	—	November 20, 2000	Anderson Mesa	LONEOS	·	3.9 km	MPC · JPL
93923	2000 WM_{161}	—	November 20, 2000	Anderson Mesa	LONEOS	·	3.1 km	MPC · JPL
93924	2000 WO_{161}	—	November 20, 2000	Anderson Mesa	LONEOS	EUN	2.6 km	MPC · JPL
93925	2000 WC_{162}	—	November 20, 2000	Anderson Mesa	LONEOS	·	3.1 km	MPC · JPL
93926	2000 WF_{162}	—	November 20, 2000	Anderson Mesa	LONEOS	·	3.1 km	MPC · JPL
93927	2000 WW_{162}	—	November 20, 2000	Anderson Mesa	LONEOS	GEF	3.9 km	MPC · JPL
93928	2000 WA_{163}	—	November 20, 2000	Anderson Mesa	LONEOS	·	3.2 km	MPC · JPL
93929	2000 WM_{163}	—	November 21, 2000	Socorro	LINEAR	GEF	3.0 km	MPC · JPL
93930	2000 WE_{164}	—	November 21, 2000	Socorro	LINEAR	·	5.0 km	MPC · JPL
93931	2000 WY_{164}	—	November 22, 2000	Haleakala	NEAT	·	2.7 km	MPC · JPL
93932	2000 WL_{165}	—	November 23, 2000	Haleakala	NEAT	MAR	2.6 km	MPC · JPL
93933	2000 WC_{166}	—	November 24, 2000	Anderson Mesa	LONEOS	·	3.8 km	MPC · JPL
93934	2000 WC_{167}	—	November 24, 2000	Anderson Mesa	LONEOS	·	2.4 km	MPC · JPL
93935	2000 WE_{168}	—	November 25, 2000	Socorro	LINEAR	MAR	2.7 km	MPC · JPL
93936	2000 WH_{170}	—	November 24, 2000	Anderson Mesa	LONEOS	·	3.7 km	MPC · JPL
93937	2000 WM_{170}	—	November 24, 2000	Anderson Mesa	LONEOS	·	3.5 km	MPC · JPL
93938	2000 WH_{171}	—	November 24, 2000	Kitt Peak	Spacewatch	·	2.4 km	MPC · JPL
93939	2000 WO_{171}	—	November 25, 2000	Socorro	LINEAR	·	4.6 km	MPC · JPL
93940	2000 WW_{171}	—	November 25, 2000	Socorro	LINEAR	MAR	2.8 km	MPC · JPL
93941	2000 WF_{172}	—	November 25, 2000	Socorro	LINEAR	HNS	3.2 km	MPC · JPL
93942	2000 WK_{172}	—	November 25, 2000	Socorro	LINEAR	HNS	3.5 km	MPC · JPL
93943	2000 WR_{172}	—	November 25, 2000	Socorro	LINEAR	·	9.8 km	MPC · JPL
93944	2000 WV_{172}	—	November 25, 2000	Socorro	LINEAR	·	2.9 km	MPC · JPL
93945	2000 WC_{174}	—	November 26, 2000	Socorro	LINEAR	·	5.6 km	MPC · JPL
93946	2000 WW_{174}	—	November 26, 2000	Socorro	LINEAR	·	2.2 km	MPC · JPL
93947	2000 WQ_{175}	—	November 26, 2000	Socorro	LINEAR	·	4.2 km	MPC · JPL
93948	2000 WK_{177}	—	November 27, 2000	Socorro	LINEAR	·	3.8 km	MPC · JPL
93949	2000 WZ_{178}	—	November 30, 2000	Gnosca	S. Sposetti	·	3.1 km	MPC · JPL
93950	2000 WB_{179}	—	November 25, 2000	Socorro	LINEAR	HNS	3.2 km	MPC · JPL
93951	2000 WT_{179}	—	November 26, 2000	Socorro	LINEAR	·	3.6 km	MPC · JPL
93952	2000 WK_{181}	—	November 30, 2000	Anderson Mesa	LONEOS	MAR	3.0 km	MPC · JPL
93953	2000 WY_{181}	—	November 25, 2000	Socorro	LINEAR	·	2.7 km	MPC · JPL
93954	2000 WQ_{182}	—	November 20, 2000	Anderson Mesa	LONEOS	HNS ·	2.2 km	MPC · JPL
93955	2000 WT_{183}	—	November 30, 2000	Anderson Mesa	LONEOS	EOS · slow	3.7 km	MPC · JPL
93956	2000 WM_{184}	—	November 30, 2000	Anderson Mesa	LONEOS	·	3.1 km	MPC · JPL
93957	2000 WM_{186}	—	November 27, 2000	Socorro	LINEAR	·	4.8 km	MPC · JPL
93958	2000 WP_{187}	—	November 16, 2000	Anderson Mesa	LONEOS	·	4.9 km	MPC · JPL
93959	2000 WR_{187}	—	November 16, 2000	Anderson Mesa	LONEOS	·	2.0 km	MPC · JPL
93960	2000 WE_{191}	—	November 19, 2000	Anderson Mesa	LONEOS	·	3.9 km	MPC · JPL
93961	2000 WF_{191}	—	November 19, 2000	Anderson Mesa	LONEOS	·	2.9 km	MPC · JPL
93962	2000 WG_{192}	—	November 19, 2000	Anderson Mesa	LONEOS	·	5.5 km	MPC · JPL
93963	2000 XE	—	December 1, 2000	Farpoint	G. Hug	ADE	4.8 km	MPC · JPL
93964	2000 XL_{2}	—	December 4, 2000	Haleakala	NEAT	·	4.2 km	MPC · JPL
93965	2000 XL_{3}	—	December 1, 2000	Socorro	LINEAR	EUN	3.8 km	MPC · JPL
93966	2000 XU_{3}	—	December 1, 2000	Socorro	LINEAR	·	2.9 km	MPC · JPL
93967	2000 XA_{4}	—	December 1, 2000	Socorro	LINEAR	·	3.3 km	MPC · JPL
93968	2000 XO_{5}	—	December 1, 2000	Socorro	LINEAR	·	4.4 km	MPC · JPL
93969	2000 XQ_{5}	—	December 1, 2000	Socorro	LINEAR	MAR	4.5 km	MPC · JPL
93970	2000 XR_{6}	—	December 1, 2000	Socorro	LINEAR	EUN	2.9 km	MPC · JPL
93971	2000 XS_{6}	—	December 1, 2000	Socorro	LINEAR	·	5.0 km	MPC · JPL
93972	2000 XF_{7}	—	December 1, 2000	Socorro	LINEAR	slow	2.4 km	MPC · JPL
93973	2000 XR_{7}	—	December 1, 2000	Socorro	LINEAR	·	8.1 km	MPC · JPL
93974	2000 XT_{7}	—	December 1, 2000	Socorro	LINEAR	EOS	4.8 km	MPC · JPL
93975	2000 XC_{8}	—	December 1, 2000	Socorro	LINEAR	GEF	4.8 km	MPC · JPL
93976	2000 XT_{8}	—	December 1, 2000	Socorro	LINEAR	·	6.4 km	MPC · JPL
93977	2000 XV_{8}	—	December 1, 2000	Socorro	LINEAR	·	2.5 km	MPC · JPL
93978	2000 XT_{9}	—	December 1, 2000	Socorro	LINEAR	EUN	3.8 km	MPC · JPL
93979	2000 XF_{11}	—	December 1, 2000	Socorro	LINEAR	EUN	2.4 km	MPC · JPL
93980	2000 XP_{11}	—	December 4, 2000	Socorro	LINEAR	·	3.8 km	MPC · JPL
93981	2000 XU_{11}	—	December 4, 2000	Socorro	LINEAR	·	3.4 km	MPC · JPL
93982	2000 XZ_{11}	—	December 4, 2000	Socorro	LINEAR	·	8.9 km	MPC · JPL
93983	2000 XK_{12}	—	December 4, 2000	Socorro	LINEAR	·	4.1 km	MPC · JPL
93984	2000 XT_{12}	—	December 4, 2000	Socorro	LINEAR	·	4.5 km	MPC · JPL
93985	2000 XU_{15}	—	December 1, 2000	Socorro	LINEAR	MAR	2.9 km	MPC · JPL
93986	2000 XZ_{15}	—	December 1, 2000	Socorro	LINEAR	MAR	2.2 km	MPC · JPL
93987	2000 XB_{16}	—	December 1, 2000	Socorro	LINEAR	·	3.9 km	MPC · JPL
93988	2000 XC_{16}	—	December 1, 2000	Socorro	LINEAR	slow	5.1 km	MPC · JPL
93989	2000 XT_{16}	—	December 1, 2000	Socorro	LINEAR	EOS	5.8 km	MPC · JPL
93990	2000 XZ_{16}	—	December 1, 2000	Socorro	LINEAR	EUN	3.9 km	MPC · JPL
93991	2000 XM_{17}	—	December 1, 2000	Socorro	LINEAR	·	8.1 km	MPC · JPL
93992	2000 XO_{17}	—	December 1, 2000	Socorro	LINEAR	·	3.2 km	MPC · JPL
93993	2000 XX_{17}	—	December 4, 2000	Socorro	LINEAR	·	4.5 km	MPC · JPL
93994	2000 XW_{18}	—	December 4, 2000	Socorro	LINEAR	·	2.9 km	MPC · JPL
93995	2000 XA_{19}	—	December 4, 2000	Socorro	LINEAR	·	2.9 km	MPC · JPL
93996	2000 XO_{19}	—	December 4, 2000	Socorro	LINEAR	·	7.9 km	MPC · JPL
93997	2000 XT_{19}	—	December 4, 2000	Socorro	LINEAR	EUN	3.1 km	MPC · JPL
93998	2000 XL_{20}	—	December 4, 2000	Socorro	LINEAR	·	5.2 km	MPC · JPL
93999	2000 XZ_{20}	—	December 4, 2000	Socorro	LINEAR	·	2.6 km	MPC · JPL
94000	2000 XK_{21}	—	December 4, 2000	Socorro	LINEAR	MAR	3.3 km	MPC · JPL

back to top

== See also ==
- Meanings of minor-planet names: 93001–94000
