= Meanings of minor-planet names: 93001–94000 =

As minor planet discoveries are confirmed, they are given a permanent number by the IAU's Minor Planet Center (MPC), and the discoverers can then submit names for them, following the IAU's naming conventions. The list below concerns those minor planets in the specified number-range that have received names, and explains the meanings of those names.

Official naming citations of newly named small Solar System bodies are approved and published in a bulletin by IAU's Working Group for Small Bodies Nomenclature (WGSBN). Before May 2021, citations were published in MPC's Minor Planet Circulars for many decades. Recent citations can also be found on the JPL Small-Body Database (SBDB). Until his death in 2016, German astronomer Lutz D. Schmadel compiled these citations into the Dictionary of Minor Planet Names (DMP) and regularly updated the collection.

Based on Paul Herget's The Names of the Minor Planets, Schmadel also researched the unclear origin of numerous asteroids, most of which had been named prior to World War II. This article incorporates text from this source, which is in the public domain: SBDB New namings may only be added to this list below after official publication as the preannouncement of names is condemned. The WGSBN publishes a comprehensive guideline for the naming rules of non-cometary small Solar System bodies.

== 93001–93100 ==
Named minor planet	Provisional	This minor planet was named for...	Ref · Catalog
93061 Barbagallo	2000 SX_{20}	Mariano Barbagallo (1933–2005), a former colleague and friend of co-discoverer Ermes Colombini, was a retiree of a bank and an exemplary Italian father, patient and generous with his four sons.	JPL · 93061

== 93101–93200 ==
back to top

Named minor planet	Provisional	This minor planet was named for...	Ref · Catalog
93102 Leroy	2000 ST_{43}	Valère Leroy (born 1961), a French physical sciences teacher and amateur astronomer has also been an active member of the Rouen Observatory for more than 20 years. He has been very devoted to bringing young people to astronomy and communicates his passion to them.	JPL · 93102
93164 Gordontelepun	2000 SR_{89}	Gordon Telepun (born 1957), an American amateur astronomer and observer of solar eclipses who lives in Decatur, Alabama. He is a cosmetic and reconstructive surgeon and graduated from Boston University School of Medicine.	IAU · 93164

== 93201–93300 ==
back to top

Named minor planet	Provisional	This minor planet was named for...	Ref · Catalog
93256 Stach	2000 SD_{163}	Daniel Stach (born 1988) is a Czech journalist covering science. In the last five years he has moderated a TV show where he interviewed 15 Nobel Prize laureates and many other leading world scientists. He has been awarded the Vojtěch Náprstek Medal for achievements in popularizing science from the Czech Academy of Sciences.	JPL · 93256

== 93301–93400 ==
back to top

Named minor planet	Provisional	This minor planet was named for...	Ref · Catalog
There are no named minor planets in this number range

== 93401–93500 ==
back to top

Named minor planet	Provisional	This minor planet was named for...	Ref · Catalog
There are no named minor planets in this number range

== 93501–93600 ==
back to top

Named minor planet	Provisional	This minor planet was named for...	Ref · Catalog
There are no named minor planets in this number range

== 93601–93700 ==
back to top

Named minor planet	Provisional	This minor planet was named for...	Ref · Catalog
There are no named minor planets in this number range

== 93701–93800 ==
back to top

Named minor planet	Provisional	This minor planet was named for...	Ref · Catalog
There are no named minor planets in this number range

== 93801–93900 ==
back to top

Named minor planet	Provisional	This minor planet was named for...	Ref · Catalog
There are no named minor planets in this number range

== 93901–94000 ==
back to top

Named minor planet	Provisional	This minor planet was named for...	Ref · Catalog
There are no named minor planets in this number range

back to top

Preceded by 92,001–93,000	Meanings of minor-planet names List of minor planets: 93,001–94,000	Succeeded by 94,001–95,000
