= List of named minor planets: 60000–69999 =

This is a partial list of named minor planets in numerical order. It contains a total of 218 entries as of 28 September 2026. Minor planets for which no article exist are displayed in grey color and redirect to the list of minor planets (see List of minor planets § Main index).

== From 60,000 to 69,999 ==
- 60000 Miminko
- 60001 Adélka
- 60006 Holgermandel
- 60008 Jarda
- 60148 Seanurban
- 60150 Zacharias
- 60183 Falcone
- 60186 Las Cruces
- 60406 Albertosuci
- 60423 Chvojen
- 60532 Henson
- 60558 Echeclus
- 60609 Kerryprice
- 60614 Tomshea
- 60622 Pritchet
- 60669 Georgpick
- 60972 Matenko
- 61042 Noviello
- 61189 Ohsadaharu
- 61190 Johnschutt
- 61195 Martinoli
- 61208 Stonařov
- 61342 Lovejoy
- 61344 Jicakyoryokutai
- 61384 Arturoromer
- 61386 Namikoshi
- 61400 Voxandreae
- 61401 Schiff
- 61402 Franciseveritt
- 61404 Očenášek
- 61444 Katokimiko
- 61850 Christophbrunner
- 61912 Storrs
- 61913 Lanning
- 62071 Voegtli
- 62151 Mayumisuzuki
- 62152 Akatsuki
- 62190 Augusthorch
- 62503 Tomcave
- 62666 Rainawessen
- 62701 Davidrankin
- 62794 Scheirich
- 63032 Billschmitt
- 63068 Moraes
- 63129 Courtemanche
- 63145 Choemuseon
- 63156 Yicheon
- 63162 Davidčapek
- 63163 Jerusalem
- 63305 Bobkepple
- 63307 Barbarawilson
- 63363 Guengerich
- 63387 Brazos Bend
- 63389 Noshiro
- 63440 Rożek
- 63463 Calamandrei
- 63498 Whitehead
- 63528 Kocherhans
- 63605 Budperry
- 63609 Françoisecolas
- 63787 Michelmaurette
- 63788 Jonlarsen
- 63862 Amyledbetter
- 63897 Ofunato
- 64070 NEAT
- 64288 Lamchiuying
- 64289 Shihwingching
- 64290 Yaushingtung
- 64291 Anglee
- 64295 Tangtisheng
- 64296 Hokoon
- 64547 Saku
- 64553 Segorbe
- 64840 Cristinapauselli
- 64974 Savaria
- 64975 Gianrix
- 65001 Teodorescu
- 65091 Saramagrin
- 65100 Birtwhistle
- 65159 Sprowls
- 65191 Janespencer
- 65210 Stichius
- 65213 Peterhobbs
- 65241 Seeley
- 65244 Ianwong
- 65357 Antoniucci
- 65363 Ruthanna
- 65487 Divinacommedia
- 65489 Ceto
- 65541 Kasbek
- 65583 Theoklymenos
- 65590 Archeptolemos
- 65635 Hirayamashin
- 65637 Tsniimash
- 65657 Hube
- 65658 Gurnikovskaya
- 65672 Merrick
- 65675 Mohr-Gruber
- 65685 Behring
- 65688 Jarnac
- 65692 Trifu
- 65694 Franzrosenzweig
- 65696 Pierrehenry
- 65697 Paulandrew
- 65698 Emmarochelle
- 65708 Ehrlich
- 65712 Schneidmüller
- 65716 Ohkinohama
- 65769 Mahalia
- 65770 Leonardotestoni
- 65775 Reikotosa
- 65784 Naderayama
- 65785 Carlafracci
- 65803 Didymos
- 65821 De Curtis
- 65848 Enricomari
- 65852 Alle
- 65859 Mädler
- 65864 Claudepieplu
- 65866 Wynneozrics
- 65885 Lubenow
- 65894 Echizenmisaki
- 65937 Hervéconstans
- 66000 Duilialoncao
- 66002 Shadoks
- 66097 Maximelebreton
- 66144 Célinereylé
- 66151 Josefhanuš
- 66197 Isabosc
- 66198 Micheltallon
- 66200 Gibis
- 66207 Carpi
- 66250 Giovanardi
- 66391 Moshup
- 66454 Terezabeatriz
- 66458 Romaplanetario
- 66479 Healy
- 66480 Riese
- 66583 Nicandra
- 66652 Borasisi
- 66661 Wallin
- 66667 Kambič
- 66669 Aradac
- 66671 Sfasu
- 66843 Pulido
- 66846 Franklederer
- 66856 Stephenvoss
- 66885 Wangxiaomo
- 66934 Kálalová
- 66939 Franscini
- 66999 Cudnik
- 67019 Hlohovec
- 67070 Rinaldi
- 67085 Oppenheimer
- 67235 Fairbank
- 67308 Öveges
- 67711 Mitsuotoyokawa
- 67712 Kimotsuki
- 67853 Iwamura
- 67979 Michelory
- 68021 Taiki
- 68109 Naomipasachoff
- 68114 Deákferenc
- 68144 Mizser
- 68218 Nealgalt
- 68325 Begues
- 68410 Nichols
- 68448 Sidneywolff
- 68585 Skorov
- 68718 Safi
- 68719 Jangyeongsil
- 68730 Straižys
- 68779 Schöninger
- 68853 Vaimaca
- 68947 Brunofunk
- 68948 Mikeoates
- 69159 Ivanking
- 69228 Kamerunberg
- 69230 Hermes
- 69231 Alettajacobs
- 69239 Johnstarling
- 69245 Persiceto
- 69259 Savostyanov
- 69260 Tonyjudt
- 69261 Philaret
- 69263 Big Ben
- 69264 Nebra
- 69273 Derbyastro
- 69275 Wiesenthal
- 69286 von Liebig
- 69287 Günthereichhorn
- 69288 Berlioz
- 69295 Stecklum
- 69311 Russ
- 69312 Rogerbacon
- 69406 Martz-Kohl
- 69421 Keizosaji
- 69423 Openuni
- 69434 de Gerlache
- 69460 Christibarnard
- 69469 Krumbenowe
- 69496 Zaoryuzan
- 69500 Ginobartali
- 69556 Félixdelafuente
- 69565 Giulioscarfi
- 69585 Albertoraugei
- 69594 Ulferika
- 69596 Balkowski
- 69754 Mosesmendel
- 69756 Hélènecourtois
- 69839 Denishuber
- 69848 Thomaspetit
- 69869 Haining
- 69870 Fizeau
- 69949 Thierrydemange
- 69961 Millosevich
- 69971 Tanzi
- 69977 Saurodonati
back to top

== See also ==
- List of minor planet discoverers
- List of observatory codes
- Meanings of minor planet names § Index
