= Meanings of minor-planet names: 63001–64000 =

As minor planet discoveries are confirmed, they are given a permanent number by the IAU's Minor Planet Center (MPC), and the discoverers can then submit names for them, following the IAU's naming conventions. The list below concerns those minor planets in the specified number-range that have received names, and explains the meanings of those names.

Official naming citations of newly named small Solar System bodies are approved and published in a bulletin by IAU's Working Group for Small Bodies Nomenclature (WGSBN). Before May 2021, citations were published in MPC's Minor Planet Circulars for many decades. Recent citations can also be found on the JPL Small-Body Database (SBDB). Until his death in 2016, German astronomer Lutz D. Schmadel compiled these citations into the Dictionary of Minor Planet Names (DMP) and regularly updated the collection.

Based on Paul Herget's The Names of the Minor Planets, Schmadel also researched the unclear origin of numerous asteroids, most of which had been named prior to World War II. This article incorporates text from this source, which is in the public domain: SBDB New namings may only be added to this list below after official publication as the preannouncement of names is condemned. The WGSBN publishes a comprehensive guideline for the naming rules of non-cometary small Solar System bodies.

== 63001–63100 ==
Named minor planet	Provisional	This minor planet was named for...	Ref · Catalog
63032 Billschmitt	2000 WS_{62}	William C. Schmitt, science educator, museum administrator, curriculum developer and university instructor	JPL · 63032
63068 Moraes	2000 WT_{123}	Wenceslau de Moraes, Portuguese writer	JPL · 63068

== 63101–63200 ==
back to top

Named minor planet	Provisional	This minor planet was named for...	Ref · Catalog
63129 Courtemanche	2000 WH_{183}	Michel Courtemanche (born 1964), an internationally known Canadian comedian and actor from Quebec.	JPL · 63129
63145 Choemuseon	2000 XY_{13}	Ch'oe Mu-sŏn (1325–1395), a Korean chemist in the late Koryeo Dynasty who was the first to study gunpowder in Korea. Gunpowder manufacturing became a highly advanced technology, into which he put enormous effort. His research helped the nation bring about political and social change.	JPL · 63145
63156 Yicheon	2000 XQ_{44}	Yi Cheon (1376–1451) was a Korean polymath in charge of developing astronomical instruments. He also influenced metal printing, musical instruments and standardization of measurement systems. Great technological achievements in the Chosun Dynasty would be almost unthinkable without his contributions.	JPL · 63156
63162 Davidčapek	2000 YE_{11}	David Čapek (born 1977), a Czech astronomer at the Astronomical Institute of the Czech Academy of Sciences. He performs theoretical work on non-gravitational effects on small solar system bodies and on the thermal stress and rotation of meteoroids.	JPL · 63162
63163 Jerusalem	2000 YR_{11}	Jerusalem, the ancient Middle Eastern city. Its unique position among cities of the world derives from its crucial role in religious history as a holy city for three great monotheistic religions: Judaism, Christianity and Islam.	JPL · 63163

== 63201–63300 ==
back to top

Named minor planet	Provisional	This minor planet was named for...	Ref · Catalog
There are no named minor planets in this number range

== 63301–63400 ==
back to top

Named minor planet	Provisional	This minor planet was named for...	Ref · Catalog
63305 Bobkepple	2001 FE	George Robert Kepple (Bob Kepple), American author of the Astro Cards observing aids and co-author of The Night Sky Observer's Guide	JPL · 63305
63307 Barbarawilson	2001 FG_{9}	Barbara Wilson (1947–2019) was an accomplished visual astronomer, mentor, Texas Star Party speaker chairman, and the director of the George Observatory for many years. She was a virtual "who's who" in amateur astronomy with an infectious love of the night sky, and was cited in many astronomy presentations.	IAU · 63307
63363 Guengerich	2001 FC_{184}	Marilyn Guengerich (b. 1953) provided years of administrative service to the University of Arizona Lunar and Planetary Laboratory and MMT Observatory, supporting graduate students, research groups and facilities	IAU · 63363
63387 Brazos Bend	2001 HC_{67}	Brazos Bend State Park, Texas, is the home to the George Observatory (735), where this minor planet was discovered. The Park is located on 4975 acres in Fort Bend County. One of America's top ten state parks, it is rich in wildlife, including the American alligator.	JPL · 63387
63389 Noshiro	2001 JC_{1}	Noshiro City is located in the northwestern part of Akita Prefecture, Japan. Since the establishment of Noshiro Rocket Testing Center, static-firing tests on various solid rocket motors used for space science have been carried out there.	JPL · 63389

== 63401–63500 ==
back to top

Named minor planet	Provisional	This minor planet was named for...	Ref · Catalog
63440 Rożek	2001 MD_{30}	Agata Rożek (born 1986) is a research associate at the University of Kent (UK) and performs optical and radar observations of near-Earth asteroids to determine their shapes and spin states and to search for evidence of non-gravitational forces acting upon them.	IAU · 63440
63463 Calamandrei	2001 OR_{12}	Marco Calamandrei (b. 1954), an Italian amateur astronomer.	IAU · 63463
63498 Whitehead	2001 OQ_{65}	Gustave Whitehead (1874-1927), German-born American inventor and aeronautical engineer, most well-known for reports of inventing and piloting a functional aircraft over two years before the Wright brothers	IAU · 63498

== 63501–63600 ==
back to top

Named minor planet	Provisional	This minor planet was named for...	Ref · Catalog
63528 Kocherhans	2001 PX_{13}	Joseph G. Kocherhans (born 1929) participated extensively in the recovery of Badlands Observatory, South Dakota, after a tragic fire in 1998. As part of this effort he designed, fabricated and donated an ingenious system to automate dome control. Prior to this, he had an extensive and noteworthy career in geological and civil engineering.	JPL · 63528

== 63601–63700 ==
back to top

Named minor planet	Provisional	This minor planet was named for...	Ref · Catalog
63605 Budperry	2001 QE_{68}	Bud Perry (born 1936) is the president of the Oakley Foundation which provided major funding for the construction of the Oakley Observatory were this minor planet was discovered.	JPL · 63605
63609 Françoisecolas	2001 QY_{72}	Francoise Colas (born 1958) is a French amateur astronomer who has taken part in numerous trans-Neptunian stellar occultation observations all over the world. She is also part of the observation team at the Pic du Midi 1-m telescope.	JPL · 63609

== 63701–63800 ==
back to top

Named minor planet	Provisional	This minor planet was named for...	Ref · Catalog
63787 Michelmaurette	2001 RW_{16}	Michel Maurette (1993–2024), French astronomer who worked in planetary science and astrobiology.	JPL · 63787
63788 Jonlarsen	2001 RL_{17}	Jon Larsen (born 1959), Norwegian gypsy jazz guitarist and amateur science researcher.	JPL · 63788

== 63801–63900 ==
back to top

Named minor planet	Provisional	This minor planet was named for...	Ref · Catalog
63862 Amyledbetter	2001 RL_{100}	Amy Susan Ledbetter (born 1958), is a retired American human resources director, fiber artist, gourmet cook, and National Parks enthusiast. She is a supporter of NASA's Lucy mission where she is known as the voice of "It's a binary!". She counts many astronomers as friends, including her husband, (6386).	JPL · 63862
63897 Ofunato	2001 SM_{9}	Ofunato City is located on the south coast of Iwate Prefecture, Japan. Since the establishment of Sanriku Balloon Center in this city, a total of 413 heavy scientific balloons were launched until its closure in 2007. The center contributed greatly to the development of space science in Japan.	JPL · 63897

== 63901–64000 ==
back to top

Named minor planet	Provisional	This minor planet was named for...	Ref · Catalog
There are no named minor planets in this number range

back to top

Preceded by 62,001–63,000	Meanings of minor-planet names List of minor planets: 63,001–64,000	Succeeded by 64,001–65,000
