= List of minor planets: 63001–64000 =

The following is a partial list of minor planets, running from minor-planet number 63001 through 64000, inclusive. The primary data for this and other partial lists is based on JPL's "Small-Body Orbital Elements" and data available from the Minor Planet Center. Critical list information is also provided by the MPC, unless otherwise specified from Lowell Observatory. A detailed description of the table's columns and additional sources are given on the main page including a complete list of every page in this series, and a statistical break-up on the dynamical classification of minor planets.

Also see the summary list of all named bodies in numerical and alphabetical order, and the corresponding naming citations for the number range of this particular list. New namings may only be added to this list after official publication, as the preannouncement of names is condemned by the Working Group for Small Bodies Nomenclature of the International Astronomical Union.

Near-Earth obj.	MBA (inner)	MBA (outer)	Centaur
Mars-crosser	MBA (middle)	Jupiter trojan	Trans-Neptunian obj.
Unclassified

== 63001–63100 ==
Designation			Discovery			Properties		Ref
Permanent	Provisional	Named after	Date	Site	Discoverer(s)	Category	Diam.	Ref
63001	2000 WW_{21}	—	November 20, 2000	Socorro	LINEAR	·	4.1 km	MPC · JPL
63002	2000 WH_{22}	—	November 20, 2000	Socorro	LINEAR	·	5.5 km	MPC · JPL
63003	2000 WY_{22}	—	November 20, 2000	Socorro	LINEAR	·	6.0 km	MPC · JPL
63004	2000 WA_{23}	—	November 20, 2000	Socorro	LINEAR	NAE	6.5 km	MPC · JPL
63005	2000 WF_{23}	—	November 20, 2000	Socorro	LINEAR	·	6.5 km	MPC · JPL
63006	2000 WE_{24}	—	November 20, 2000	Socorro	LINEAR	·	4.0 km	MPC · JPL
63007	2000 WF_{30}	—	November 20, 2000	Socorro	LINEAR	·	9.8 km	MPC · JPL
63008	2000 WH_{31}	—	November 20, 2000	Socorro	LINEAR	·	8.4 km	MPC · JPL
63009	2000 WH_{32}	—	November 20, 2000	Socorro	LINEAR	BRA	5.2 km	MPC · JPL
63010	2000 WQ_{33}	—	November 20, 2000	Socorro	LINEAR	·	4.1 km	MPC · JPL
63011	2000 WZ_{36}	—	November 20, 2000	Socorro	LINEAR	·	1.9 km	MPC · JPL
63012	2000 WU_{37}	—	November 20, 2000	Socorro	LINEAR	V	1.6 km	MPC · JPL
63013	2000 WO_{38}	—	November 20, 2000	Socorro	LINEAR	V	1.8 km	MPC · JPL
63014	2000 WJ_{39}	—	November 20, 2000	Socorro	LINEAR	·	3.1 km	MPC · JPL
63015	2000 WK_{39}	—	November 20, 2000	Socorro	LINEAR	·	9.2 km	MPC · JPL
63016	2000 WE_{40}	—	November 20, 2000	Socorro	LINEAR	EOS	4.9 km	MPC · JPL
63017	2000 WB_{41}	—	November 20, 2000	Socorro	LINEAR	·	7.1 km	MPC · JPL
63018	2000 WO_{41}	—	November 20, 2000	Socorro	LINEAR	·	6.4 km	MPC · JPL
63019	2000 WY_{41}	—	November 21, 2000	Socorro	LINEAR	·	3.4 km	MPC · JPL
63020	2000 WW_{44}	—	November 21, 2000	Socorro	LINEAR	·	1.9 km	MPC · JPL
63021	2000 WK_{46}	—	November 21, 2000	Socorro	LINEAR	·	5.3 km	MPC · JPL
63022	2000 WV_{46}	—	November 21, 2000	Socorro	LINEAR	HYG	7.1 km	MPC · JPL
63023	2000 WB_{48}	—	November 21, 2000	Socorro	LINEAR	·	2.0 km	MPC · JPL
63024	2000 WH_{48}	—	November 21, 2000	Socorro	LINEAR	DOR	5.3 km	MPC · JPL
63025	2000 WC_{52}	—	November 27, 2000	Kitt Peak	Spacewatch	·	5.9 km	MPC · JPL
63026	2000 WF_{54}	—	November 20, 2000	Socorro	LINEAR	(2076)	2.4 km	MPC · JPL
63027	2000 WL_{56}	—	November 21, 2000	Socorro	LINEAR	·	2.1 km	MPC · JPL
63028	2000 WF_{57}	—	November 21, 2000	Socorro	LINEAR	·	9.2 km	MPC · JPL
63029	2000 WH_{57}	—	November 21, 2000	Socorro	LINEAR	·	6.8 km	MPC · JPL
63030	2000 WK_{58}	—	November 21, 2000	Socorro	LINEAR	·	4.6 km	MPC · JPL
63031	2000 WC_{62}	—	November 26, 2000	Socorro	LINEAR	EOS	5.1 km	MPC · JPL
63032 Billschmitt	2000 WS_{62}	Billschmitt	November 28, 2000	Fountain Hills	C. W. Juels	·	5.5 km	MPC · JPL
63033	2000 WM_{65}	—	November 28, 2000	Kitt Peak	Spacewatch	DOR	5.8 km	MPC · JPL
63034	2000 WV_{67}	—	November 20, 2000	Anderson Mesa	LONEOS	·	5.9 km	MPC · JPL
63035	2000 WX_{67}	—	November 29, 2000	Kitt Peak	Kitt Peak	EOS	5.2 km	MPC · JPL
63036	2000 WL_{69}	—	November 19, 2000	Socorro	LINEAR	·	4.5 km	MPC · JPL
63037	2000 WB_{70}	—	November 19, 2000	Socorro	LINEAR	·	1.7 km	MPC · JPL
63038	2000 WP_{70}	—	November 19, 2000	Socorro	LINEAR	EOS	4.7 km	MPC · JPL
63039	2000 WS_{71}	—	November 19, 2000	Socorro	LINEAR	·	4.2 km	MPC · JPL
63040	2000 WT_{74}	—	November 20, 2000	Socorro	LINEAR	·	5.0 km	MPC · JPL
63041	2000 WH_{77}	—	November 20, 2000	Socorro	LINEAR	·	6.9 km	MPC · JPL
63042	2000 WP_{79}	—	November 20, 2000	Socorro	LINEAR	·	4.2 km	MPC · JPL
63043	2000 WZ_{83}	—	November 20, 2000	Socorro	LINEAR	·	2.4 km	MPC · JPL
63044	2000 WR_{86}	—	November 20, 2000	Socorro	LINEAR	·	2.7 km	MPC · JPL
63045	2000 WO_{91}	—	November 21, 2000	Socorro	LINEAR	HYG	6.6 km	MPC · JPL
63046	2000 WJ_{93}	—	November 21, 2000	Socorro	LINEAR	·	6.8 km	MPC · JPL
63047	2000 WQ_{93}	—	November 21, 2000	Socorro	LINEAR	(5)	2.4 km	MPC · JPL
63048	2000 WU_{94}	—	November 21, 2000	Socorro	LINEAR	·	7.6 km	MPC · JPL
63049	2000 WC_{95}	—	November 21, 2000	Socorro	LINEAR	KOR	3.4 km	MPC · JPL
63050	2000 WG_{96}	—	November 21, 2000	Socorro	LINEAR	CYB	9.1 km	MPC · JPL
63051	2000 WR_{96}	—	November 21, 2000	Socorro	LINEAR	·	3.6 km	MPC · JPL
63052	2000 WB_{98}	—	November 21, 2000	Socorro	LINEAR	·	3.6 km	MPC · JPL
63053	2000 WU_{99}	—	November 21, 2000	Socorro	LINEAR	·	3.3 km	MPC · JPL
63054	2000 WG_{100}	—	November 21, 2000	Socorro	LINEAR	·	6.4 km	MPC · JPL
63055	2000 WP_{107}	—	November 20, 2000	Socorro	LINEAR	(16286)	4.8 km	MPC · JPL
63056	2000 WQ_{110}	—	November 20, 2000	Socorro	LINEAR	URS	12 km	MPC · JPL
63057	2000 WB_{112}	—	November 20, 2000	Socorro	LINEAR	·	2.2 km	MPC · JPL
63058	2000 WC_{112}	—	November 20, 2000	Socorro	LINEAR	·	4.8 km	MPC · JPL
63059	2000 WA_{118}	—	November 20, 2000	Socorro	LINEAR	·	6.1 km	MPC · JPL
63060	2000 WD_{118}	—	November 20, 2000	Socorro	LINEAR	·	3.1 km	MPC · JPL
63061	2000 WH_{118}	—	November 20, 2000	Socorro	LINEAR	·	3.2 km	MPC · JPL
63062	2000 WL_{118}	—	November 20, 2000	Socorro	LINEAR	·	6.6 km	MPC · JPL
63063	2000 WU_{120}	—	November 20, 2000	Socorro	LINEAR	·	3.4 km	MPC · JPL
63064	2000 WC_{121}	—	November 21, 2000	Socorro	LINEAR	·	6.5 km	MPC · JPL
63065	2000 WS_{121}	—	November 26, 2000	Socorro	LINEAR	·	3.4 km	MPC · JPL
63066	2000 WQ_{122}	—	November 29, 2000	Socorro	LINEAR	EOS	3.8 km	MPC · JPL
63067	2000 WZ_{122}	—	November 29, 2000	Socorro	LINEAR	·	7.6 km	MPC · JPL
63068 Moraes	2000 WT_{123}	Moraes	November 23, 2000	Shishikui	Maeno, H.	T_{j} (2.97)	7.3 km	MPC · JPL
63069	2000 WG_{125}	—	November 27, 2000	Socorro	LINEAR	·	6.6 km	MPC · JPL
63070	2000 WH_{125}	—	November 27, 2000	Socorro	LINEAR	·	4.9 km	MPC · JPL
63071	2000 WM_{125}	—	November 29, 2000	Socorro	LINEAR	·	7.3 km	MPC · JPL
63072	2000 WP_{125}	—	November 29, 2000	Socorro	LINEAR	·	2.1 km	MPC · JPL
63073	2000 WQ_{125}	—	November 30, 2000	Socorro	LINEAR	·	2.6 km	MPC · JPL
63074	2000 WU_{125}	—	November 30, 2000	Socorro	LINEAR	·	7.1 km	MPC · JPL
63075	2000 WC_{126}	—	November 30, 2000	Socorro	LINEAR	·	3.8 km	MPC · JPL
63076	2000 WV_{127}	—	November 18, 2000	Socorro	LINEAR	·	7.6 km	MPC · JPL
63077	2000 WT_{128}	—	November 19, 2000	Kitt Peak	Spacewatch	AGN	2.6 km	MPC · JPL
63078	2000 WC_{130}	—	November 19, 2000	Socorro	LINEAR	·	4.5 km	MPC · JPL
63079	2000 WY_{130}	—	November 20, 2000	Anderson Mesa	LONEOS	·	2.9 km	MPC · JPL
63080	2000 WW_{132}	—	November 19, 2000	Socorro	LINEAR	·	8.8 km	MPC · JPL
63081	2000 WP_{133}	—	November 19, 2000	Socorro	LINEAR	·	4.7 km	MPC · JPL
63082	2000 WU_{133}	—	November 19, 2000	Socorro	LINEAR	GEF	3.5 km	MPC · JPL
63083	2000 WG_{134}	—	November 19, 2000	Socorro	LINEAR	EOS	5.0 km	MPC · JPL
63084	2000 WP_{134}	—	November 19, 2000	Socorro	LINEAR	·	5.7 km	MPC · JPL
63085	2000 WM_{135}	—	November 19, 2000	Socorro	LINEAR	·	7.1 km	MPC · JPL
63086	2000 WQ_{135}	—	November 19, 2000	Socorro	LINEAR	·	11 km	MPC · JPL
63087	2000 WC_{137}	—	November 20, 2000	Anderson Mesa	LONEOS	·	12 km	MPC · JPL
63088	2000 WM_{139}	—	November 21, 2000	Socorro	LINEAR	·	8.3 km	MPC · JPL
63089	2000 WX_{139}	—	November 21, 2000	Socorro	LINEAR	·	4.8 km	MPC · JPL
63090	2000 WY_{139}	—	November 21, 2000	Socorro	LINEAR	·	1.2 km	MPC · JPL
63091	2000 WZ_{141}	—	November 20, 2000	Anderson Mesa	LONEOS	·	9.5 km	MPC · JPL
63092	2000 WJ_{142}	—	November 20, 2000	Anderson Mesa	LONEOS	·	5.6 km	MPC · JPL
63093	2000 WM_{142}	—	November 20, 2000	Anderson Mesa	LONEOS	·	3.8 km	MPC · JPL
63094	2000 WP_{142}	—	November 20, 2000	Anderson Mesa	LONEOS	·	8.9 km	MPC · JPL
63095	2000 WS_{142}	—	November 20, 2000	Anderson Mesa	LONEOS	·	3.4 km	MPC · JPL
63096	2000 WX_{142}	—	November 20, 2000	Anderson Mesa	LONEOS	·	4.4 km	MPC · JPL
63097	2000 WK_{143}	—	November 20, 2000	Anderson Mesa	LONEOS	·	3.5 km	MPC · JPL
63098	2000 WC_{146}	—	November 23, 2000	Haleakala	NEAT	·	4.9 km	MPC · JPL
63099	2000 WM_{146}	—	November 23, 2000	Haleakala	NEAT	·	9.2 km	MPC · JPL
63100	2000 WP_{146}	—	November 23, 2000	Haleakala	NEAT	·	8.0 km	MPC · JPL

== 63101–63200 ==
back to top

Designation			Discovery			Properties		Ref
Permanent	Provisional	Named after	Date	Site	Discoverer(s)	Category	Diam.	Ref
63101	2000 WT_{146}	—	November 25, 2000	Haleakala	NEAT	HNS	5.1 km	MPC · JPL
63102	2000 WD_{149}	—	November 29, 2000	Haleakala	NEAT	·	7.7 km	MPC · JPL
63103	2000 WG_{149}	—	November 22, 2000	Haleakala	NEAT	·	6.9 km	MPC · JPL
63104	2000 WR_{151}	—	November 29, 2000	Haleakala	NEAT	ADE	7.1 km	MPC · JPL
63105	2000 WW_{151}	—	November 29, 2000	Haleakala	NEAT	·	3.1 km	MPC · JPL
63106	2000 WE_{152}	—	November 25, 2000	Socorro	LINEAR	·	2.2 km	MPC · JPL
63107	2000 WX_{152}	—	November 29, 2000	Socorro	LINEAR	·	5.2 km	MPC · JPL
63108	2000 WB_{154}	—	November 30, 2000	Socorro	LINEAR	EOS	5.0 km	MPC · JPL
63109	2000 WK_{154}	—	November 30, 2000	Socorro	LINEAR	EOS	4.4 km	MPC · JPL
63110	2000 WQ_{158}	—	November 30, 2000	Haleakala	NEAT	·	4.3 km	MPC · JPL
63111	2000 WG_{161}	—	November 20, 2000	Anderson Mesa	LONEOS	EOS	5.5 km	MPC · JPL
63112	2000 WS_{161}	—	November 20, 2000	Anderson Mesa	LONEOS	·	6.5 km	MPC · JPL
63113	2000 WB_{163}	—	November 20, 2000	Anderson Mesa	LONEOS	EOS	5.2 km	MPC · JPL
63114	2000 WA_{164}	—	November 21, 2000	Socorro	LINEAR	·	2.8 km	MPC · JPL
63115	2000 WH_{165}	—	November 23, 2000	Haleakala	NEAT	·	4.7 km	MPC · JPL
63116	2000 WT_{165}	—	November 23, 2000	Haleakala	NEAT	·	3.5 km	MPC · JPL
63117	2000 WJ_{169}	—	November 26, 2000	Desert Beaver	W. K. Y. Yeung	·	8.4 km	MPC · JPL
63118	2000 WR_{171}	—	November 25, 2000	Socorro	LINEAR	TIR	7.2 km	MPC · JPL
63119	2000 WX_{171}	—	November 25, 2000	Socorro	LINEAR	EUN	3.5 km	MPC · JPL
63120	2000 WW_{172}	—	November 25, 2000	Anderson Mesa	LONEOS	EUN	3.3 km	MPC · JPL
63121	2000 WL_{173}	—	November 25, 2000	Anderson Mesa	LONEOS	URS	11 km	MPC · JPL
63122	2000 WR_{173}	—	November 26, 2000	Socorro	LINEAR	EUN	2.8 km	MPC · JPL
63123	2000 WB_{174}	—	November 26, 2000	Socorro	LINEAR	·	3.9 km	MPC · JPL
63124	2000 WK_{174}	—	November 26, 2000	Socorro	LINEAR	·	6.5 km	MPC · JPL
63125	2000 WV_{174}	—	November 26, 2000	Socorro	LINEAR	·	8.7 km	MPC · JPL
63126	2000 WV_{181}	—	November 25, 2000	Anderson Mesa	LONEOS	BAR	3.2 km	MPC · JPL
63127	2000 WW_{181}	—	November 25, 2000	Socorro	LINEAR	EUN	2.1 km	MPC · JPL
63128	2000 WD_{182}	—	November 25, 2000	Socorro	LINEAR	fast	6.1 km	MPC · JPL
63129 Courtemanche	2000 WH_{183}	Courtemanche	November 30, 2000	Gnosca	S. Sposetti	KOR	2.7 km	MPC · JPL
63130	2000 WA_{184}	—	November 30, 2000	Anderson Mesa	LONEOS	·	2.8 km	MPC · JPL
63131	2000 WG_{186}	—	November 27, 2000	Socorro	LINEAR	·	2.3 km	MPC · JPL
63132	2000 WF_{188}	—	November 17, 2000	Kitt Peak	Spacewatch	·	5.2 km	MPC · JPL
63133	2000 WH_{188}	—	November 18, 2000	Socorro	LINEAR	·	5.7 km	MPC · JPL
63134	2000 WU_{190}	—	November 18, 2000	Anderson Mesa	LONEOS	·	3.0 km	MPC · JPL
63135	2000 WX_{190}	—	November 19, 2000	Anderson Mesa	LONEOS	PHO	3.6 km	MPC · JPL
63136	2000 WD_{191}	—	November 19, 2000	Anderson Mesa	LONEOS	·	7.4 km	MPC · JPL
63137	2000 WM_{191}	—	November 19, 2000	Anderson Mesa	LONEOS	RAF	3.1 km	MPC · JPL
63138	2000 WQ_{191}	—	November 19, 2000	Anderson Mesa	LONEOS	·	6.8 km	MPC · JPL
63139	2000 WR_{191}	—	November 19, 2000	Anderson Mesa	LONEOS	EOS	3.5 km	MPC · JPL
63140	2000 WT_{191}	—	November 19, 2000	Anderson Mesa	LONEOS	·	3.3 km	MPC · JPL
63141	2000 WD_{192}	—	November 19, 2000	Anderson Mesa	LONEOS	·	9.2 km	MPC · JPL
63142	2000 XZ	—	December 2, 2000	Haleakala	NEAT	H	1.8 km	MPC · JPL
63143	2000 XS_{1}	—	December 3, 2000	Kitt Peak	Spacewatch	·	2.9 km	MPC · JPL
63144	2000 XQ_{3}	—	December 1, 2000	Socorro	LINEAR	·	4.8 km	MPC · JPL
63145 Choemuseon	2000 XY_{13}	Choemuseon	December 4, 2000	Bohyunsan	Jeon, Y.-B., Lee, B.-C.	THM	5.9 km	MPC · JPL
63146	2000 XM_{14}	—	December 1, 2000	Kitt Peak	Spacewatch	·	12 km	MPC · JPL
63147	2000 XF_{19}	—	December 4, 2000	Socorro	LINEAR	·	4.3 km	MPC · JPL
63148	2000 XQ_{19}	—	December 4, 2000	Socorro	LINEAR	EOS	5.5 km	MPC · JPL
63149	2000 XM_{22}	—	December 4, 2000	Socorro	LINEAR	·	9.5 km	MPC · JPL
63150	2000 XH_{23}	—	December 4, 2000	Socorro	LINEAR	·	8.1 km	MPC · JPL
63151	2000 XR_{23}	—	December 4, 2000	Socorro	LINEAR	·	6.7 km	MPC · JPL
63152	2000 XC_{27}	—	December 4, 2000	Socorro	LINEAR	·	4.0 km	MPC · JPL
63153	2000 XF_{28}	—	December 4, 2000	Socorro	LINEAR	V	1.7 km	MPC · JPL
63154	2000 XR_{37}	—	December 5, 2000	Socorro	LINEAR	·	3.7 km	MPC · JPL
63155	2000 XZ_{39}	—	December 5, 2000	Socorro	LINEAR	·	10 km	MPC · JPL
63156 Yicheon	2000 XQ_{44}	Yicheon	December 5, 2000	Bohyunsan	Jeon, Y.-B., Lee, B.-C.	EOS	5.5 km	MPC · JPL
63157	2000 YL_{2}	—	December 19, 2000	Haleakala	NEAT	·	5.8 km	MPC · JPL
63158	2000 YA_{4}	—	December 20, 2000	Kitt Peak	Spacewatch	·	2.5 km	MPC · JPL
63159	2000 YF_{6}	—	December 20, 2000	Socorro	LINEAR	EOS	5.7 km	MPC · JPL
63160	2000 YN_{8}	—	December 16, 2000	Uccle	T. Pauwels	·	1.9 km	MPC · JPL
63161	2000 YZ_{10}	—	December 22, 2000	Socorro	LINEAR	·	5.6 km	MPC · JPL
63162 Davidčapek	2000 YE_{11}	Davidčapek	December 22, 2000	Ondřejov	P. Pravec, P. Kušnirák	·	11 km	MPC · JPL
63163 Jerusalem	2000 YR_{11}	Jerusalem	December 23, 2000	Kleť	Kočer, M.	PHO	4.3 km	MPC · JPL
63164	2000 YU_{14}	—	December 23, 2000	Uenohara	Uenohara	·	1.9 km	MPC · JPL
63165	2000 YY_{14}	—	December 20, 2000	Uccle	T. Pauwels	EOS	5.0 km	MPC · JPL
63166	2000 YW_{17}	—	December 20, 2000	Socorro	LINEAR	EOS	4.5 km	MPC · JPL
63167	2000 YY_{17}	—	December 20, 2000	Socorro	LINEAR	·	4.2 km	MPC · JPL
63168	2000 YH_{20}	—	December 25, 2000	Kitt Peak	Spacewatch	·	2.4 km	MPC · JPL
63169	2000 YM_{31}	—	December 31, 2000	Kitt Peak	Spacewatch	·	2.6 km	MPC · JPL
63170	2000 YE_{33}	—	December 29, 2000	Haleakala	NEAT	·	2.2 km	MPC · JPL
63171	2000 YU_{40}	—	December 30, 2000	Socorro	LINEAR	·	5.7 km	MPC · JPL
63172	2000 YN_{41}	—	December 30, 2000	Socorro	LINEAR	·	9.0 km	MPC · JPL
63173	2000 YX_{52}	—	December 30, 2000	Socorro	LINEAR	·	4.7 km	MPC · JPL
63174	2000 YB_{55}	—	December 30, 2000	Socorro	LINEAR	·	2.0 km	MPC · JPL
63175	2000 YS_{55}	—	December 30, 2000	Socorro	LINEAR	L4	20 km	MPC · JPL
63176	2000 YN_{59}	—	December 30, 2000	Socorro	LINEAR	L4	12 km	MPC · JPL
63177	2000 YJ_{63}	—	December 30, 2000	Socorro	LINEAR	·	9.1 km	MPC · JPL
63178	2000 YJ_{69}	—	December 30, 2000	Socorro	LINEAR	·	6.9 km	MPC · JPL
63179	2000 YZ_{77}	—	December 30, 2000	Socorro	LINEAR	EOS	4.2 km	MPC · JPL
63180	2000 YK_{81}	—	December 30, 2000	Socorro	LINEAR	EOS	4.7 km	MPC · JPL
63181	2000 YN_{81}	—	December 30, 2000	Socorro	LINEAR	·	5.5 km	MPC · JPL
63182	2000 YM_{84}	—	December 30, 2000	Socorro	LINEAR	·	3.1 km	MPC · JPL
63183	2000 YK_{88}	—	December 30, 2000	Socorro	LINEAR	HYG	8.6 km	MPC · JPL
63184	2000 YL_{91}	—	December 30, 2000	Socorro	LINEAR	HIL · 3:2	17 km	MPC · JPL
63185	2000 YW_{93}	—	December 30, 2000	Socorro	LINEAR	·	4.0 km	MPC · JPL
63186	2000 YB_{94}	—	December 30, 2000	Socorro	LINEAR	·	5.7 km	MPC · JPL
63187	2000 YJ_{94}	—	December 30, 2000	Socorro	LINEAR	·	3.3 km	MPC · JPL
63188	2000 YE_{96}	—	December 30, 2000	Socorro	LINEAR	·	4.1 km	MPC · JPL
63189	2000 YC_{97}	—	December 30, 2000	Socorro	LINEAR	BRA	4.4 km	MPC · JPL
63190	2000 YB_{103}	—	December 28, 2000	Socorro	LINEAR	·	5.3 km	MPC · JPL
63191	2000 YP_{106}	—	December 30, 2000	Socorro	LINEAR	·	3.0 km	MPC · JPL
63192	2000 YZ_{107}	—	December 30, 2000	Socorro	LINEAR	·	5.1 km	MPC · JPL
63193	2000 YY_{118}	—	December 27, 2000	Anderson Mesa	LONEOS	L4	20 km	MPC · JPL
63194	2000 YB_{120}	—	December 19, 2000	Anderson Mesa	LONEOS	·	4.5 km	MPC · JPL
63195	2000 YN_{120}	—	December 19, 2000	Socorro	LINEAR	L4	25 km	MPC · JPL
63196	2000 YY_{121}	—	December 23, 2000	Socorro	LINEAR	·	5.6 km	MPC · JPL
63197	2000 YP_{122}	—	December 28, 2000	Socorro	LINEAR	EOS	4.8 km	MPC · JPL
63198	2000 YY_{122}	—	December 28, 2000	Socorro	LINEAR	EOS	5.4 km	MPC · JPL
63199	2000 YJ_{123}	—	December 28, 2000	Kitt Peak	Spacewatch	·	4.7 km	MPC · JPL
63200	2000 YE_{124}	—	December 29, 2000	Anderson Mesa	LONEOS	·	12 km	MPC · JPL

== 63201–63300 ==
back to top

Designation			Discovery			Properties		Ref
Permanent	Provisional	Named after	Date	Site	Discoverer(s)	Category	Diam.	Ref
63201	2000 YH_{129}	—	December 29, 2000	Kitt Peak	Spacewatch	·	6.6 km	MPC · JPL
63202	2000 YR_{131}	—	December 30, 2000	Socorro	LINEAR	L4	20 km	MPC · JPL
63203	2000 YA_{132}	—	December 30, 2000	Socorro	LINEAR	KOR	2.9 km	MPC · JPL
63204	2000 YE_{135}	—	December 17, 2000	Anderson Mesa	LONEOS	TEL	4.8 km	MPC · JPL
63205	2000 YG_{139}	—	December 27, 2000	Kitt Peak	Spacewatch	L4	20 km	MPC · JPL
63206	2000 YF_{143}	—	December 23, 2000	Socorro	LINEAR	·	4.4 km	MPC · JPL
63207	2001 AK_{6}	—	January 2, 2001	Socorro	LINEAR	V	1.5 km	MPC · JPL
63208	2001 AJ_{10}	—	January 2, 2001	Socorro	LINEAR	·	4.8 km	MPC · JPL
63209	2001 AP_{11}	—	January 2, 2001	Socorro	LINEAR	V	1.6 km	MPC · JPL
63210	2001 AH_{13}	—	January 2, 2001	Socorro	LINEAR	L4	20 km	MPC · JPL
63211	2001 AU_{13}	—	January 2, 2001	Socorro	LINEAR	·	4.6 km	MPC · JPL
63212	2001 AT_{17}	—	January 2, 2001	Socorro	LINEAR	·	3.4 km	MPC · JPL
63213	2001 AY_{18}	—	January 4, 2001	Haleakala	NEAT	·	6.1 km	MPC · JPL
63214	2001 AP_{20}	—	January 3, 2001	Socorro	LINEAR	·	7.6 km	MPC · JPL
63215	2001 AD_{25}	—	January 4, 2001	Socorro	LINEAR	·	4.2 km	MPC · JPL
63216	2001 AF_{26}	—	January 5, 2001	Socorro	LINEAR	·	5.6 km	MPC · JPL
63217	2001 AU_{29}	—	January 4, 2001	Socorro	LINEAR	·	3.0 km	MPC · JPL
63218	2001 AZ_{29}	—	January 4, 2001	Socorro	LINEAR	·	2.4 km	MPC · JPL
63219	2001 AD_{32}	—	January 4, 2001	Socorro	LINEAR	·	3.2 km	MPC · JPL
63220	2001 AU_{32}	—	January 4, 2001	Socorro	LINEAR	·	4.5 km	MPC · JPL
63221	2001 AZ_{32}	—	January 4, 2001	Socorro	LINEAR	·	6.3 km	MPC · JPL
63222	2001 AM_{36}	—	January 5, 2001	Socorro	LINEAR	·	2.3 km	MPC · JPL
63223	2001 AV_{36}	—	January 5, 2001	Socorro	LINEAR	·	3.3 km	MPC · JPL
63224	2001 AQ_{37}	—	January 5, 2001	Socorro	LINEAR	·	10 km	MPC · JPL
63225	2001 BL_{2}	—	January 18, 2001	Haleakala	NEAT	H	1.5 km	MPC · JPL
63226	2001 BC_{4}	—	January 18, 2001	Socorro	LINEAR	·	1.6 km	MPC · JPL
63227	2001 BG_{6}	—	January 19, 2001	Socorro	LINEAR	EOS	4.7 km	MPC · JPL
63228	2001 BF_{9}	—	January 19, 2001	Socorro	LINEAR	·	3.6 km	MPC · JPL
63229	2001 BP_{9}	—	January 19, 2001	Socorro	LINEAR	EOS	4.3 km	MPC · JPL
63230	2001 BT_{14}	—	January 21, 2001	Oizumi	T. Kobayashi	THM	5.1 km	MPC · JPL
63231	2001 BA_{15}	—	January 21, 2001	Oizumi	T. Kobayashi	L4	19 km	MPC · JPL
63232	2001 BK_{15}	—	January 21, 2001	Oizumi	T. Kobayashi	(1298)	7.1 km	MPC · JPL
63233	2001 BO_{17}	—	January 19, 2001	Socorro	LINEAR	·	1.7 km	MPC · JPL
63234	2001 BB_{20}	—	January 19, 2001	Socorro	LINEAR	L4	20 km	MPC · JPL
63235	2001 BV_{20}	—	January 19, 2001	Socorro	LINEAR	CYB	9.7 km	MPC · JPL
63236	2001 BX_{20}	—	January 19, 2001	Socorro	LINEAR	MAS	1.8 km	MPC · JPL
63237	2001 BA_{23}	—	January 20, 2001	Socorro	LINEAR	·	3.3 km	MPC · JPL
63238	2001 BL_{24}	—	January 20, 2001	Socorro	LINEAR	·	2.5 km	MPC · JPL
63239	2001 BD_{25}	—	January 20, 2001	Socorro	LINEAR	L4	19 km	MPC · JPL
63240	2001 BG_{26}	—	January 20, 2001	Socorro	LINEAR	·	3.2 km	MPC · JPL
63241	2001 BJ_{26}	—	January 20, 2001	Socorro	LINEAR	L4	23 km	MPC · JPL
63242	2001 BJ_{27}	—	January 20, 2001	Socorro	LINEAR	·	3.0 km	MPC · JPL
63243	2001 BW_{27}	—	January 20, 2001	Socorro	LINEAR	·	2.7 km	MPC · JPL
63244	2001 BO_{28}	—	January 20, 2001	Socorro	LINEAR	NYS	3.2 km	MPC · JPL
63245	2001 BP_{30}	—	January 20, 2001	Socorro	LINEAR	·	4.6 km	MPC · JPL
63246	2001 BG_{32}	—	January 20, 2001	Socorro	LINEAR	·	2.4 km	MPC · JPL
63247	2001 BN_{34}	—	January 20, 2001	Socorro	LINEAR	·	1.8 km	MPC · JPL
63248	2001 BP_{34}	—	January 20, 2001	Socorro	LINEAR	·	5.4 km	MPC · JPL
63249	2001 BW_{35}	—	January 18, 2001	Socorro	LINEAR	HIL · 3:2	15 km	MPC · JPL
63250	2001 BP_{36}	—	January 21, 2001	Socorro	LINEAR	·	4.5 km	MPC · JPL
63251	2001 BG_{38}	—	January 21, 2001	Socorro	LINEAR	HYG	5.6 km	MPC · JPL
63252	2001 BL_{41}	—	January 19, 2001	Kitt Peak	Spacewatch	centaur	35 km	MPC · JPL
63253	2001 BG_{50}	—	January 21, 2001	Socorro	LINEAR	EUN	3.0 km	MPC · JPL
63254	2001 BW_{54}	—	January 19, 2001	Socorro	LINEAR	·	2.8 km	MPC · JPL
63255	2001 BX_{63}	—	January 29, 2001	Socorro	LINEAR	·	2.9 km	MPC · JPL
63256	2001 BY_{77}	—	January 25, 2001	Haleakala	NEAT	·	3.4 km	MPC · JPL
63257	2001 BJ_{79}	—	January 21, 2001	Socorro	LINEAR	L4	14 km	MPC · JPL
63258	2001 BT_{80}	—	January 19, 2001	Haleakala	NEAT	·	6.6 km	MPC · JPL
63259	2001 BS_{81}	—	January 30, 2001	Bergisch Gladbach	W. Bickel	L4	10 km	MPC · JPL
63260	2001 CN	—	February 1, 2001	Socorro	LINEAR	H	1.7 km	MPC · JPL
63261	2001 CA_{2}	—	February 1, 2001	Socorro	LINEAR	EOS	4.3 km	MPC · JPL
63262	2001 CM_{3}	—	February 1, 2001	Socorro	LINEAR	·	2.2 km	MPC · JPL
63263	2001 CC_{4}	—	February 1, 2001	Socorro	LINEAR	·	6.7 km	MPC · JPL
63264	2001 CP_{5}	—	February 1, 2001	Socorro	LINEAR	V	1.5 km	MPC · JPL
63265	2001 CP_{12}	—	February 1, 2001	Socorro	LINEAR	L4	19 km	MPC · JPL
63266	2001 CV_{16}	—	February 1, 2001	Socorro	LINEAR	HYG	8.3 km	MPC · JPL
63267	2001 CC_{17}	—	February 1, 2001	Socorro	LINEAR	·	2.9 km	MPC · JPL
63268	2001 CU_{22}	—	February 1, 2001	Anderson Mesa	LONEOS	·	1.9 km	MPC · JPL
63269	2001 CE_{24}	—	February 1, 2001	Anderson Mesa	LONEOS	L4	20 km	MPC · JPL
63270	2001 CR_{28}	—	February 2, 2001	Anderson Mesa	LONEOS	·	7.0 km	MPC · JPL
63271	2001 CN_{34}	—	February 13, 2001	Socorro	LINEAR	·	6.9 km	MPC · JPL
63272	2001 CC_{49}	—	February 1, 2001	Anderson Mesa	LONEOS	L4	20 km	MPC · JPL
63273	2001 DH_{4}	—	February 16, 2001	Socorro	LINEAR	L4	30 km	MPC · JPL
63274	2001 DB_{18}	—	February 16, 2001	Socorro	LINEAR	EOS	5.5 km	MPC · JPL
63275	2001 DD_{21}	—	February 16, 2001	Socorro	LINEAR	(2076)	2.0 km	MPC · JPL
63276	2001 DP_{22}	—	February 17, 2001	Socorro	LINEAR	EUN	4.2 km	MPC · JPL
63277	2001 DG_{23}	—	February 17, 2001	Socorro	LINEAR	·	2.4 km	MPC · JPL
63278	2001 DJ_{29}	—	February 17, 2001	Socorro	LINEAR	L4	15 km	MPC · JPL
63279	2001 DW_{34}	—	February 19, 2001	Socorro	LINEAR	L4	10 km	MPC · JPL
63280	2001 DT_{37}	—	February 19, 2001	Socorro	LINEAR	EOS	4.1 km	MPC · JPL
63281	2001 DF_{38}	—	February 19, 2001	Socorro	LINEAR	·	2.4 km	MPC · JPL
63282	2001 DP_{45}	—	February 19, 2001	Socorro	LINEAR	·	1.5 km	MPC · JPL
63283	2001 DA_{46}	—	February 19, 2001	Socorro	LINEAR	CYB	5.7 km	MPC · JPL
63284	2001 DM_{46}	—	February 19, 2001	Socorro	LINEAR	L4	12 km	MPC · JPL
63285	2001 DW_{62}	—	February 19, 2001	Socorro	LINEAR	EOS	4.4 km	MPC · JPL
63286	2001 DZ_{68}	—	February 19, 2001	Socorro	LINEAR	L4	16 km	MPC · JPL
63287	2001 DT_{79}	—	February 20, 2001	Haleakala	NEAT	L4	19 km	MPC · JPL
63288	2001 DW_{79}	—	February 20, 2001	Haleakala	NEAT	EOS	4.4 km	MPC · JPL
63289	2001 DJ_{81}	—	February 26, 2001	Oizumi	T. Kobayashi	·	3.1 km	MPC · JPL
63290	2001 DS_{87}	—	February 21, 2001	Anderson Mesa	LONEOS	L4	20 km	MPC · JPL
63291	2001 DU_{87}	—	February 16, 2001	Socorro	LINEAR	L4	13 km	MPC · JPL
63292	2001 DQ_{89}	—	February 22, 2001	Socorro	LINEAR	L4	18 km	MPC · JPL
63293	2001 DT_{89}	—	February 22, 2001	Socorro	LINEAR	3:2	9.4 km	MPC · JPL
63294	2001 DQ_{90}	—	February 21, 2001	Kitt Peak	Spacewatch	L4	20 km	MPC · JPL
63295	2001 DY_{101}	—	February 16, 2001	Socorro	LINEAR	·	2.1 km	MPC · JPL
63296	2001 EK	—	March 2, 2001	Desert Beaver	W. K. Y. Yeung	NYS	2.7 km	MPC · JPL
63297	2001 EE_{5}	—	March 2, 2001	Anderson Mesa	LONEOS	·	2.7 km	MPC · JPL
63298	2001 EH_{6}	—	March 2, 2001	Anderson Mesa	LONEOS	·	3.0 km	MPC · JPL
63299	2001 EH_{8}	—	March 2, 2001	Anderson Mesa	LONEOS	·	5.4 km	MPC · JPL
63300	2001 EV_{8}	—	March 2, 2001	Anderson Mesa	LONEOS	·	3.0 km	MPC · JPL

== 63301–63400 ==
back to top

Designation			Discovery			Properties		Ref
Permanent	Provisional	Named after	Date	Site	Discoverer(s)	Category	Diam.	Ref
63301	2001 EJ_{12}	—	March 3, 2001	Socorro	LINEAR	·	3.2 km	MPC · JPL
63302	2001 EA_{14}	—	March 15, 2001	Socorro	LINEAR	·	9.7 km	MPC · JPL
63303	2001 EL_{20}	—	March 15, 2001	Anderson Mesa	LONEOS	NYS	1.9 km	MPC · JPL
63304	2001 EQ_{23}	—	March 15, 2001	Haleakala	NEAT	slow	4.7 km	MPC · JPL
63305 Bobkepple	2001 FE	Bobkepple	March 17, 2001	Junk Bond	D. Healy	HYG	6.2 km	MPC · JPL
63306	2001 FT_{8}	—	March 18, 2001	Socorro	LINEAR	·	2.4 km	MPC · JPL
63307 Barbarawilson	2001 FG_{9}	Barbarawilson	March 21, 2001	Needville	Needville	·	3.1 km	MPC · JPL
63308	2001 FU_{11}	—	March 19, 2001	Anderson Mesa	LONEOS	·	2.5 km	MPC · JPL
63309	2001 FV_{19}	—	March 19, 2001	Anderson Mesa	LONEOS	NYS	2.7 km	MPC · JPL
63310	2001 FS_{21}	—	March 21, 2001	Anderson Mesa	LONEOS	SUL	5.0 km	MPC · JPL
63311	2001 FD_{24}	—	March 21, 2001	Socorro	LINEAR	H	1.8 km	MPC · JPL
63312	2001 FH_{24}	—	March 17, 2001	Socorro	LINEAR	LIX	9.3 km	MPC · JPL
63313	2001 FV_{28}	—	March 19, 2001	Socorro	LINEAR	·	6.9 km	MPC · JPL
63314	2001 FJ_{33}	—	March 18, 2001	Socorro	LINEAR	MAR ·	3.7 km	MPC · JPL
63315	2001 FV_{34}	—	March 18, 2001	Socorro	LINEAR	·	2.3 km	MPC · JPL
63316	2001 FK_{35}	—	March 18, 2001	Socorro	LINEAR	·	7.0 km	MPC · JPL
63317	2001 FQ_{36}	—	March 18, 2001	Socorro	LINEAR	·	2.4 km	MPC · JPL
63318	2001 FR_{36}	—	March 18, 2001	Socorro	LINEAR	MIS	4.3 km	MPC · JPL
63319	2001 FH_{37}	—	March 18, 2001	Socorro	LINEAR	·	1.8 km	MPC · JPL
63320	2001 FX_{44}	—	March 18, 2001	Socorro	LINEAR	·	6.1 km	MPC · JPL
63321	2001 FF_{47}	—	March 18, 2001	Socorro	LINEAR	·	3.8 km	MPC · JPL
63322	2001 FO_{48}	—	March 18, 2001	Socorro	LINEAR	·	1.8 km	MPC · JPL
63323	2001 FC_{51}	—	March 18, 2001	Socorro	LINEAR	·	1.7 km	MPC · JPL
63324	2001 FH_{51}	—	March 18, 2001	Socorro	LINEAR	·	2.5 km	MPC · JPL
63325	2001 FU_{51}	—	March 18, 2001	Socorro	LINEAR	NYS	2.7 km	MPC · JPL
63326	2001 FV_{53}	—	March 18, 2001	Socorro	LINEAR	·	3.1 km	MPC · JPL
63327	2001 FS_{54}	—	March 19, 2001	Socorro	LINEAR	NYS	2.2 km	MPC · JPL
63328	2001 FU_{54}	—	March 19, 2001	Socorro	LINEAR	MAS	1.6 km	MPC · JPL
63329	2001 FJ_{55}	—	March 21, 2001	Socorro	LINEAR	ADE	6.0 km	MPC · JPL
63330	2001 FZ_{59}	—	March 19, 2001	Socorro	LINEAR	·	1.8 km	MPC · JPL
63331	2001 FC_{60}	—	March 19, 2001	Socorro	LINEAR	V	1.5 km	MPC · JPL
63332	2001 FY_{62}	—	March 19, 2001	Socorro	LINEAR	·	3.1 km	MPC · JPL
63333	2001 FV_{65}	—	March 19, 2001	Socorro	LINEAR	·	1.7 km	MPC · JPL
63334	2001 FH_{66}	—	March 19, 2001	Socorro	LINEAR	·	5.6 km	MPC · JPL
63335	2001 FD_{67}	—	March 19, 2001	Socorro	LINEAR	·	2.3 km	MPC · JPL
63336	2001 FL_{67}	—	March 19, 2001	Socorro	LINEAR	·	1.7 km	MPC · JPL
63337	2001 FW_{67}	—	March 19, 2001	Socorro	LINEAR	·	4.0 km	MPC · JPL
63338	2001 FX_{74}	—	March 19, 2001	Socorro	LINEAR	·	3.3 km	MPC · JPL
63339	2001 FP_{75}	—	March 19, 2001	Socorro	LINEAR	·	1.9 km	MPC · JPL
63340	2001 FY_{76}	—	March 19, 2001	Socorro	LINEAR	V	1.4 km	MPC · JPL
63341	2001 FD_{77}	—	March 19, 2001	Socorro	LINEAR	·	6.1 km	MPC · JPL
63342	2001 FH_{77}	—	March 19, 2001	Socorro	LINEAR	·	4.3 km	MPC · JPL
63343	2001 FO_{85}	—	March 26, 2001	Kitt Peak	Spacewatch	·	5.2 km	MPC · JPL
63344	2001 FX_{86}	—	March 21, 2001	Anderson Mesa	LONEOS	EUN	3.2 km	MPC · JPL
63345	2001 FD_{91}	—	March 26, 2001	Socorro	LINEAR	·	3.6 km	MPC · JPL
63346	2001 FU_{92}	—	March 16, 2001	Socorro	LINEAR	·	3.1 km	MPC · JPL
63347	2001 FA_{94}	—	March 16, 2001	Socorro	LINEAR	·	7.7 km	MPC · JPL
63348	2001 FC_{94}	—	March 16, 2001	Socorro	LINEAR	·	2.6 km	MPC · JPL
63349	2001 FY_{101}	—	March 17, 2001	Socorro	LINEAR	·	2.5 km	MPC · JPL
63350	2001 FL_{106}	—	March 18, 2001	Socorro	LINEAR	HYG	7.8 km	MPC · JPL
63351	2001 FW_{117}	—	March 19, 2001	Kitt Peak	Spacewatch	·	3.6 km	MPC · JPL
63352	2001 FG_{129}	—	March 26, 2001	Socorro	LINEAR	·	2.8 km	MPC · JPL
63353	2001 FZ_{135}	—	March 21, 2001	Socorro	LINEAR	·	1.8 km	MPC · JPL
63354	2001 FU_{140}	—	March 22, 2001	Kitt Peak	Spacewatch	slow	8.0 km	MPC · JPL
63355	2001 FN_{143}	—	March 23, 2001	Anderson Mesa	LONEOS	·	6.5 km	MPC · JPL
63356	2001 FG_{149}	—	March 24, 2001	Anderson Mesa	LONEOS	EOS	4.6 km	MPC · JPL
63357	2001 FS_{157}	—	March 27, 2001	Anderson Mesa	LONEOS	EUN	2.5 km	MPC · JPL
63358	2001 FX_{157}	—	March 27, 2001	Anderson Mesa	LONEOS	EOS	4.0 km	MPC · JPL
63359	2001 FQ_{159}	—	March 29, 2001	Anderson Mesa	LONEOS	·	2.2 km	MPC · JPL
63360	2001 FS_{162}	—	March 18, 2001	Socorro	LINEAR	·	2.9 km	MPC · JPL
63361	2001 FR_{171}	—	March 24, 2001	Kitt Peak	M. W. Buie	·	2.2 km	MPC · JPL
63362	2001 FD_{177}	—	March 16, 2001	Socorro	LINEAR	EOS	4.9 km	MPC · JPL
63363 Guengerich	2001 FC_{184}	Guengerich	March 25, 2001	Kitt Peak	M. W. Buie	·	1.5 km	MPC · JPL
63364	2001 HH_{2}	—	April 17, 2001	Socorro	LINEAR	·	2.3 km	MPC · JPL
63365	2001 HH_{3}	—	April 17, 2001	Socorro	LINEAR	NYS	2.7 km	MPC · JPL
63366	2001 HK_{4}	—	April 17, 2001	Desert Beaver	W. K. Y. Yeung	·	2.0 km	MPC · JPL
63367	2001 HS_{6}	—	April 18, 2001	Kitt Peak	Spacewatch	·	2.0 km	MPC · JPL
63368	2001 HQ_{7}	—	April 17, 2001	Desert Beaver	W. K. Y. Yeung	EOS	5.1 km	MPC · JPL
63369	2001 HT_{7}	—	April 17, 2001	Desert Beaver	W. K. Y. Yeung	·	3.4 km	MPC · JPL
63370	2001 HS_{9}	—	April 16, 2001	Socorro	LINEAR	NYS	3.1 km	MPC · JPL
63371	2001 HN_{18}	—	April 23, 2001	Socorro	LINEAR	·	4.0 km	MPC · JPL
63372	2001 HG_{29}	—	April 27, 2001	Socorro	LINEAR	THM	5.7 km	MPC · JPL
63373	2001 HS_{35}	—	April 29, 2001	Socorro	LINEAR	·	12 km	MPC · JPL
63374	2001 HX_{35}	—	April 29, 2001	Socorro	LINEAR	·	2.5 km	MPC · JPL
63375	2001 HY_{37}	—	April 29, 2001	Črni Vrh	Matičič, S.	·	3.3 km	MPC · JPL
63376	2001 HA_{38}	—	April 29, 2001	Črni Vrh	Matičič, S.	·	1.8 km	MPC · JPL
63377	2001 HL_{40}	—	April 27, 2001	Socorro	LINEAR	·	6.6 km	MPC · JPL
63378	2001 HY_{43}	—	April 16, 2001	Anderson Mesa	LONEOS	EOS	4.4 km	MPC · JPL
63379	2001 HN_{45}	—	April 17, 2001	Anderson Mesa	LONEOS	·	4.6 km	MPC · JPL
63380	2001 HE_{51}	—	April 23, 2001	Socorro	LINEAR	·	1.9 km	MPC · JPL
63381	2001 HJ_{53}	—	April 23, 2001	Socorro	LINEAR	·	2.0 km	MPC · JPL
63382	2001 HZ_{54}	—	April 24, 2001	Socorro	LINEAR	·	1.9 km	MPC · JPL
63383	2001 HD_{56}	—	April 24, 2001	Socorro	LINEAR	·	1.9 km	MPC · JPL
63384	2001 HG_{57}	—	April 25, 2001	Anderson Mesa	LONEOS	·	2.6 km	MPC · JPL
63385	2001 HL_{66}	—	April 24, 2001	Socorro	LINEAR	(5)	2.3 km	MPC · JPL
63386	2001 HW_{66}	—	April 25, 2001	Anderson Mesa	LONEOS	HNS	2.6 km	MPC · JPL
63387 Brazos Bend	2001 HC_{67}	Brazos Bend	April 29, 2001	Needville	Needville	·	4.5 km	MPC · JPL
63388	2001 HE_{67}	—	April 21, 2001	Socorro	LINEAR	·	2.8 km	MPC · JPL
63389 Noshiro	2001 JC_{1}	Noshiro	May 12, 2001	Bisei SG Center	BATTeRS	·	5.9 km	MPC · JPL
63390	2001 JP_{5}	—	May 14, 2001	Haleakala	NEAT	·	5.3 km	MPC · JPL
63391	2001 JG_{6}	—	May 14, 2001	Kitt Peak	Spacewatch	·	4.2 km	MPC · JPL
63392	2001 JE_{7}	—	May 15, 2001	Anderson Mesa	LONEOS	·	6.7 km	MPC · JPL
63393	2001 JS_{7}	—	May 15, 2001	Anderson Mesa	LONEOS	·	1.8 km	MPC · JPL
63394	2001 JL_{8}	—	May 15, 2001	Anderson Mesa	LONEOS	KOR	3.4 km	MPC · JPL
63395	2001 JX_{9}	—	May 15, 2001	Haleakala	NEAT	·	4.7 km	MPC · JPL
63396	2001 KX	—	May 17, 2001	Socorro	LINEAR	ERI	3.8 km	MPC · JPL
63397	2001 KK_{2}	—	May 17, 2001	Haleakala	NEAT	·	2.4 km	MPC · JPL
63398	2001 KZ_{9}	—	May 18, 2001	Socorro	LINEAR	·	4.6 km	MPC · JPL
63399	2001 KH_{11}	—	May 18, 2001	Socorro	LINEAR	·	3.4 km	MPC · JPL
63400	2001 KJ_{13}	—	May 18, 2001	Socorro	LINEAR	·	4.9 km	MPC · JPL

== 63401–63500 ==
back to top

Designation			Discovery			Properties		Ref
Permanent	Provisional	Named after	Date	Site	Discoverer(s)	Category	Diam.	Ref
63401	2001 KK_{15}	—	May 18, 2001	Socorro	LINEAR	V	1.9 km	MPC · JPL
63402	2001 KU_{24}	—	May 17, 2001	Socorro	LINEAR	V	1.7 km	MPC · JPL
63403	2001 KT_{30}	—	May 21, 2001	Socorro	LINEAR	·	4.2 km	MPC · JPL
63404	2001 KK_{31}	—	May 22, 2001	Socorro	LINEAR	·	4.2 km	MPC · JPL
63405	2001 KP_{33}	—	May 18, 2001	Socorro	LINEAR	slow	1.8 km	MPC · JPL
63406	2001 KN_{34}	—	May 18, 2001	Socorro	LINEAR	(5)	2.4 km	MPC · JPL
63407	2001 KZ_{35}	—	May 18, 2001	Socorro	LINEAR	·	2.7 km	MPC · JPL
63408	2001 KA_{38}	—	May 22, 2001	Socorro	LINEAR	·	2.5 km	MPC · JPL
63409	2001 KY_{38}	—	May 22, 2001	Socorro	LINEAR	·	3.2 km	MPC · JPL
63410	2001 KQ_{39}	—	May 22, 2001	Socorro	LINEAR	AEG	8.5 km	MPC · JPL
63411	2001 KK_{41}	—	May 24, 2001	Socorro	LINEAR	ADE	7.4 km	MPC · JPL
63412	2001 KQ_{44}	—	May 22, 2001	Socorro	LINEAR	·	5.0 km	MPC · JPL
63413	2001 KK_{47}	—	May 24, 2001	Socorro	LINEAR	·	5.3 km	MPC · JPL
63414	2001 KF_{55}	—	May 22, 2001	Socorro	LINEAR	·	3.4 km	MPC · JPL
63415	2001 KH_{55}	—	May 22, 2001	Socorro	LINEAR	·	2.7 km	MPC · JPL
63416	2001 KU_{56}	—	May 23, 2001	Socorro	LINEAR	·	2.0 km	MPC · JPL
63417	2001 KR_{58}	—	May 26, 2001	Socorro	LINEAR	·	3.9 km	MPC · JPL
63418	2001 KW_{62}	—	May 18, 2001	Anderson Mesa	LONEOS	EUN	3.3 km	MPC · JPL
63419	2001 KP_{64}	—	May 21, 2001	Goodricke-Pigott	R. A. Tucker	EUN	1.8 km	MPC · JPL
63420	2001 KB_{65}	—	May 22, 2001	Anderson Mesa	LONEOS	·	3.0 km	MPC · JPL
63421	2001 KC_{67}	—	May 26, 2001	Palomar	NEAT	·	2.4 km	MPC · JPL
63422	2001 KL_{70}	—	May 23, 2001	Anderson Mesa	LONEOS	MAR	3.2 km	MPC · JPL
63423	2001 KY_{72}	—	May 24, 2001	Socorro	LINEAR	·	3.6 km	MPC · JPL
63424	2001 KW_{73}	—	May 25, 2001	Socorro	LINEAR	·	1.9 km	MPC · JPL
63425	2001 LV_{5}	—	June 13, 2001	Anderson Mesa	LONEOS	·	3.4 km	MPC · JPL
63426	2001 LU_{13}	—	June 15, 2001	Socorro	LINEAR	slow	3.2 km	MPC · JPL
63427	2001 MB	—	June 16, 2001	Desert Beaver	W. K. Y. Yeung	NYS	3.0 km	MPC · JPL
63428	2001 MC_{1}	—	June 18, 2001	Reedy Creek	J. Broughton	·	6.3 km	MPC · JPL
63429	2001 MH_{5}	—	June 21, 2001	Calar Alto	Calar Alto	·	2.5 km	MPC · JPL
63430	2001 MR_{6}	—	June 22, 2001	Palomar	NEAT	·	1.9 km	MPC · JPL
63431	2001 ML_{14}	—	June 28, 2001	Anderson Mesa	LONEOS	·	3.8 km	MPC · JPL
63432	2001 MY_{14}	—	June 28, 2001	Anderson Mesa	LONEOS	·	3.0 km	MPC · JPL
63433	2001 MZ_{17}	—	June 28, 2001	Anderson Mesa	LONEOS	·	5.3 km	MPC · JPL
63434	2001 MD_{21}	—	June 26, 2001	Palomar	NEAT	·	2.4 km	MPC · JPL
63435	2001 MU_{21}	—	June 28, 2001	Palomar	NEAT	·	2.9 km	MPC · JPL
63436	2001 MO_{23}	—	June 27, 2001	Haleakala	NEAT	·	4.0 km	MPC · JPL
63437	2001 MY_{23}	—	June 27, 2001	Haleakala	NEAT	ADE	8.6 km	MPC · JPL
63438	2001 MY_{28}	—	June 27, 2001	Anderson Mesa	LONEOS	·	2.8 km	MPC · JPL
63439	2001 MD_{29}	—	June 27, 2001	Anderson Mesa	LONEOS	·	4.1 km	MPC · JPL
63440 Rożek	2001 MD_{30}	Rożek	June 30, 2001	Anderson Mesa	LONEOS	H	2.0 km	MPC · JPL
63441	2001 NV_{2}	—	July 12, 2001	Palomar	NEAT	·	3.2 km	MPC · JPL
63442	2001 NO_{6}	—	July 14, 2001	Socorro	LINEAR	·	10 km	MPC · JPL
63443	2001 NH_{7}	—	July 13, 2001	Palomar	NEAT	HNS	2.1 km	MPC · JPL
63444	2001 ND_{8}	—	July 14, 2001	Palomar	NEAT	·	6.4 km	MPC · JPL
63445	2001 NL_{9}	—	July 13, 2001	Palomar	NEAT	·	4.0 km	MPC · JPL
63446	2001 NV_{9}	—	July 15, 2001	Ondřejov	L. Kotková	·	1.5 km	MPC · JPL
63447	2001 NG_{11}	—	July 14, 2001	Haleakala	NEAT	·	3.5 km	MPC · JPL
63448	2001 NF_{14}	—	July 14, 2001	Palomar	NEAT	·	2.7 km	MPC · JPL
63449	2001 NO_{14}	—	July 14, 2001	Haleakala	NEAT	·	2.9 km	MPC · JPL
63450	2001 NP_{17}	—	July 14, 2001	Palomar	NEAT	·	8.0 km	MPC · JPL
63451	2001 OB	—	July 16, 2001	Reedy Creek	J. Broughton	·	3.3 km	MPC · JPL
63452	2001 OO_{2}	—	July 17, 2001	Anderson Mesa	LONEOS	H	1.2 km	MPC · JPL
63453	2001 OQ_{4}	—	July 19, 2001	Palomar	NEAT	·	1.5 km	MPC · JPL
63454	2001 OB_{5}	—	July 17, 2001	Anderson Mesa	LONEOS	·	10 km	MPC · JPL
63455	2001 OD_{5}	—	July 17, 2001	Anderson Mesa	LONEOS	·	5.6 km	MPC · JPL
63456	2001 OS_{5}	—	July 17, 2001	Anderson Mesa	LONEOS	EOS	4.8 km	MPC · JPL
63457	2001 OG_{6}	—	July 17, 2001	Anderson Mesa	LONEOS	·	2.9 km	MPC · JPL
63458	2001 OT_{6}	—	July 17, 2001	Anderson Mesa	LONEOS	·	6.8 km	MPC · JPL
63459	2001 OT_{7}	—	July 17, 2001	Anderson Mesa	LONEOS	(1298)	6.9 km	MPC · JPL
63460	2001 OA_{8}	—	July 17, 2001	Anderson Mesa	LONEOS	V	1.6 km	MPC · JPL
63461	2001 OJ_{8}	—	July 17, 2001	Anderson Mesa	LONEOS	EOS	4.5 km	MPC · JPL
63462	2001 OE_{9}	—	July 20, 2001	Anderson Mesa	LONEOS	·	8.2 km	MPC · JPL
63463 Calamandrei	2001 OR_{12}	Calamandrei	July 20, 2001	San Marcello	M. Tombelli, L. Tesi	·	2.6 km	MPC · JPL
63464	2001 OL_{16}	—	July 21, 2001	Palomar	NEAT	PHO	3.8 km	MPC · JPL
63465	2001 OL_{19}	—	July 17, 2001	Haleakala	NEAT	EOS	4.2 km	MPC · JPL
63466	2001 OM_{21}	—	July 21, 2001	Anderson Mesa	LONEOS	·	2.7 km	MPC · JPL
63467	2001 OS_{21}	—	July 21, 2001	Anderson Mesa	LONEOS	·	2.8 km	MPC · JPL
63468	2001 OY_{21}	—	July 21, 2001	Anderson Mesa	LONEOS	MAS	2.1 km	MPC · JPL
63469	2001 OP_{22}	—	July 17, 2001	Palomar	NEAT	·	4.7 km	MPC · JPL
63470	2001 OH_{23}	—	July 22, 2001	Palomar	NEAT	·	5.0 km	MPC · JPL
63471	2001 OD_{25}	—	July 16, 2001	Haleakala	NEAT	·	6.8 km	MPC · JPL
63472	2001 OY_{25}	—	July 19, 2001	Haleakala	NEAT	·	2.8 km	MPC · JPL
63473	2001 OZ_{25}	—	July 19, 2001	Haleakala	NEAT	·	4.8 km	MPC · JPL
63474	2001 OR_{27}	—	July 18, 2001	Palomar	NEAT	V	1.1 km	MPC · JPL
63475	2001 OB_{32}	—	July 23, 2001	Reedy Creek	J. Broughton	EOS	6.7 km	MPC · JPL
63476	2001 OL_{37}	—	July 20, 2001	Palomar	NEAT	GEF	2.7 km	MPC · JPL
63477	2001 OG_{38}	—	July 20, 2001	Palomar	NEAT	EOS	4.6 km	MPC · JPL
63478	2001 OR_{39}	—	July 20, 2001	Palomar	NEAT	·	3.6 km	MPC · JPL
63479	2001 OL_{40}	—	July 20, 2001	Palomar	NEAT	·	4.2 km	MPC · JPL
63480	2001 OD_{42}	—	July 22, 2001	Palomar	NEAT	V	1.4 km	MPC · JPL
63481	2001 OE_{42}	—	July 22, 2001	Palomar	NEAT	(5)	2.8 km	MPC · JPL
63482	2001 OW_{42}	—	July 22, 2001	Palomar	NEAT	·	4.3 km	MPC · JPL
63483	2001 OJ_{43}	—	July 22, 2001	Palomar	NEAT	·	2.8 km	MPC · JPL
63484	2001 OV_{48}	—	July 16, 2001	Haleakala	NEAT	·	6.7 km	MPC · JPL
63485	2001 OO_{49}	—	July 17, 2001	Anderson Mesa	LONEOS	·	4.7 km	MPC · JPL
63486	2001 OH_{55}	—	July 22, 2001	Palomar	NEAT	·	5.2 km	MPC · JPL
63487	2001 OU_{55}	—	July 22, 2001	Palomar	NEAT	·	7.1 km	MPC · JPL
63488	2001 OT_{56}	—	July 16, 2001	Anderson Mesa	LONEOS	3:2	14 km	MPC · JPL
63489	2001 OB_{57}	—	July 16, 2001	Anderson Mesa	LONEOS	·	11 km	MPC · JPL
63490	2001 OP_{59}	—	July 21, 2001	Haleakala	NEAT	·	2.6 km	MPC · JPL
63491	2001 OY_{60}	—	July 21, 2001	Haleakala	NEAT	3:2 · SHU	9.5 km	MPC · JPL
63492	2001 OL_{62}	—	July 23, 2001	Haleakala	NEAT	·	4.8 km	MPC · JPL
63493	2001 OY_{62}	—	July 20, 2001	Anderson Mesa	LONEOS	NYS	3.8 km	MPC · JPL
63494	2001 OX_{63}	—	July 23, 2001	Haleakala	NEAT	PAD	6.8 km	MPC · JPL
63495	2001 OH_{64}	—	July 24, 2001	Haleakala	NEAT	·	5.3 km	MPC · JPL
63496	2001 ON_{64}	—	July 24, 2001	Haleakala	NEAT	·	2.9 km	MPC · JPL
63497	2001 OG_{65}	—	July 22, 2001	Palomar	NEAT	·	5.0 km	MPC · JPL
63498 Whitehead	2001 OQ_{65}	Whitehead	July 28, 2001	Reedy Creek	J. Broughton	URS	8.5 km	MPC · JPL
63499	2001 ON_{69}	—	July 19, 2001	Anderson Mesa	LONEOS	·	2.9 km	MPC · JPL
63500	2001 OS_{69}	—	July 19, 2001	Anderson Mesa	LONEOS	slow	2.4 km	MPC · JPL

== 63501–63600 ==
back to top

Designation			Discovery			Properties		Ref
Permanent	Provisional	Named after	Date	Site	Discoverer(s)	Category	Diam.	Ref
63501	2001 OD_{70}	—	July 19, 2001	Anderson Mesa	LONEOS	NYS	2.2 km	MPC · JPL
63502	2001 OD_{72}	—	July 21, 2001	Anderson Mesa	LONEOS	NYS	2.1 km	MPC · JPL
63503	2001 OE_{72}	—	July 21, 2001	Anderson Mesa	LONEOS	·	1.8 km	MPC · JPL
63504	2001 OO_{78}	—	July 26, 2001	Palomar	NEAT	EOS	6.2 km	MPC · JPL
63505	2001 OP_{79}	—	July 27, 2001	Palomar	NEAT	·	2.3 km	MPC · JPL
63506	2001 OH_{81}	—	July 29, 2001	Socorro	LINEAR	·	3.2 km	MPC · JPL
63507	2001 OL_{81}	—	July 30, 2001	Socorro	LINEAR	·	3.0 km	MPC · JPL
63508	2001 OQ_{81}	—	July 26, 2001	Haleakala	NEAT	·	5.6 km	MPC · JPL
63509	2001 OW_{83}	—	July 27, 2001	Palomar	NEAT	·	3.2 km	MPC · JPL
63510	2001 OG_{89}	—	July 21, 2001	Haleakala	NEAT	·	2.8 km	MPC · JPL
63511	2001 OV_{92}	—	July 22, 2001	Palomar	NEAT	·	2.5 km	MPC · JPL
63512	2001 OZ_{95}	—	July 29, 2001	Bergisch Gladbach	W. Bickel	·	2.1 km	MPC · JPL
63513	2001 OV_{96}	—	July 25, 2001	Palomar	NEAT	H	1.5 km	MPC · JPL
63514	2001 OY_{99}	—	July 27, 2001	Anderson Mesa	LONEOS	·	4.3 km	MPC · JPL
63515	2001 OE_{100}	—	July 27, 2001	Anderson Mesa	LONEOS	·	2.6 km	MPC · JPL
63516	2001 OL_{103}	—	July 29, 2001	Palomar	NEAT	·	11 km	MPC · JPL
63517	2001 OM_{104}	—	July 30, 2001	Socorro	LINEAR	URS	9.6 km	MPC · JPL
63518	2001 OM_{105}	—	July 29, 2001	Anderson Mesa	LONEOS	·	4.7 km	MPC · JPL
63519	2001 OJ_{107}	—	July 29, 2001	Socorro	LINEAR	BAP	2.9 km	MPC · JPL
63520	2001 PF	—	August 3, 2001	Palomar	NEAT	·	8.5 km	MPC · JPL
63521	2001 PL	—	August 5, 2001	Haleakala	NEAT	HNS	3.4 km	MPC · JPL
63522	2001 PP	—	August 6, 2001	Palomar	NEAT	·	6.8 km	MPC · JPL
63523	2001 PH_{1}	—	August 9, 2001	Reedy Creek	J. Broughton	(5)	2.5 km	MPC · JPL
63524	2001 PP_{2}	—	August 3, 2001	Haleakala	NEAT	·	3.5 km	MPC · JPL
63525	2001 PU_{2}	—	August 3, 2001	Haleakala	NEAT	·	4.6 km	MPC · JPL
63526	2001 PO_{7}	—	August 7, 2001	Haleakala	NEAT	·	5.2 km	MPC · JPL
63527	2001 PM_{8}	—	August 11, 2001	Haleakala	NEAT	H	1.2 km	MPC · JPL
63528 Kocherhans	2001 PX_{13}	Kocherhans	August 13, 2001	Badlands	Dyvig, R.	·	5.0 km	MPC · JPL
63529	2001 PY_{19}	—	August 10, 2001	Palomar	NEAT	·	7.9 km	MPC · JPL
63530	2001 PG_{20}	—	August 10, 2001	Palomar	NEAT	·	7.8 km	MPC · JPL
63531	2001 PW_{20}	—	August 10, 2001	Haleakala	NEAT	KOR	3.5 km	MPC · JPL
63532	2001 PJ_{22}	—	August 10, 2001	Haleakala	NEAT	·	8.3 km	MPC · JPL
63533	2001 PY_{22}	—	August 10, 2001	Haleakala	NEAT	·	2.8 km	MPC · JPL
63534	2001 PR_{24}	—	August 11, 2001	Haleakala	NEAT	THM	6.1 km	MPC · JPL
63535	2001 PY_{24}	—	August 11, 2001	Haleakala	NEAT	·	1.6 km	MPC · JPL
63536	2001 PS_{25}	—	August 11, 2001	Haleakala	NEAT	·	4.4 km	MPC · JPL
63537	2001 PS_{33}	—	August 10, 2001	Palomar	NEAT	EOS	6.5 km	MPC · JPL
63538	2001 PG_{38}	—	August 11, 2001	Palomar	NEAT	·	6.3 km	MPC · JPL
63539	2001 PH_{39}	—	August 11, 2001	Palomar	NEAT	·	3.9 km	MPC · JPL
63540	2001 PN_{39}	—	August 11, 2001	Palomar	NEAT	PHO	3.4 km	MPC · JPL
63541	2001 PY_{41}	—	August 11, 2001	Palomar	NEAT	·	2.9 km	MPC · JPL
63542	2001 PE_{45}	—	August 11, 2001	Haleakala	NEAT	HYG	8.2 km	MPC · JPL
63543	2001 PJ_{45}	—	August 11, 2001	Haleakala	NEAT	·	3.6 km	MPC · JPL
63544	2001 PD_{47}	—	August 13, 2001	Bergisch Gladbach	W. Bickel	·	7.7 km	MPC · JPL
63545	2001 PB_{48}	—	August 3, 2001	Palomar	NEAT	PHO	2.0 km	MPC · JPL
63546	2001 PX_{53}	—	August 14, 2001	Haleakala	NEAT	·	4.3 km	MPC · JPL
63547	2001 PD_{57}	—	August 14, 2001	Haleakala	NEAT	·	9.2 km	MPC · JPL
63548	2001 PD_{58}	—	August 14, 2001	Haleakala	NEAT	·	6.2 km	MPC · JPL
63549	2001 PJ_{63}	—	August 13, 2001	Haleakala	NEAT	·	2.6 km	MPC · JPL
63550	2001 PX_{64}	—	August 1, 2001	Palomar	NEAT	(5)	2.4 km	MPC · JPL
63551	2001 QS_{1}	—	August 16, 2001	Socorro	LINEAR	·	1.4 km	MPC · JPL
63552	2001 QC_{4}	—	August 16, 2001	Socorro	LINEAR	·	3.8 km	MPC · JPL
63553	2001 QV_{6}	—	August 16, 2001	Socorro	LINEAR	·	2.3 km	MPC · JPL
63554	2001 QA_{8}	—	August 16, 2001	Socorro	LINEAR	CYB	8.0 km	MPC · JPL
63555	2001 QD_{8}	—	August 16, 2001	Socorro	LINEAR	·	4.2 km	MPC · JPL
63556	2001 QE_{10}	—	August 16, 2001	Socorro	LINEAR	·	1.7 km	MPC · JPL
63557	2001 QN_{10}	—	August 16, 2001	Socorro	LINEAR	·	1.3 km	MPC · JPL
63558	2001 QR_{10}	—	August 16, 2001	Socorro	LINEAR	·	1.3 km	MPC · JPL
63559	2001 QH_{13}	—	August 16, 2001	Socorro	LINEAR	·	4.4 km	MPC · JPL
63560	2001 QK_{13}	—	August 16, 2001	Socorro	LINEAR	·	910 m	MPC · JPL
63561	2001 QL_{13}	—	August 16, 2001	Socorro	LINEAR	NYS	2.7 km	MPC · JPL
63562	2001 QA_{15}	—	August 16, 2001	Socorro	LINEAR	(5)	2.7 km	MPC · JPL
63563	2001 QU_{15}	—	August 16, 2001	Socorro	LINEAR	·	3.3 km	MPC · JPL
63564	2001 QW_{17}	—	August 16, 2001	Socorro	LINEAR	·	5.5 km	MPC · JPL
63565	2001 QP_{18}	—	August 16, 2001	Socorro	LINEAR	·	3.6 km	MPC · JPL
63566	2001 QT_{18}	—	August 16, 2001	Socorro	LINEAR	·	4.6 km	MPC · JPL
63567	2001 QK_{19}	—	August 16, 2001	Socorro	LINEAR	·	1.9 km	MPC · JPL
63568	2001 QA_{21}	—	August 16, 2001	Socorro	LINEAR	THM	8.9 km	MPC · JPL
63569	2001 QK_{22}	—	August 16, 2001	Socorro	LINEAR	·	4.3 km	MPC · JPL
63570	2001 QN_{22}	—	August 16, 2001	Socorro	LINEAR	·	4.6 km	MPC · JPL
63571	2001 QC_{23}	—	August 16, 2001	Socorro	LINEAR	NYS	2.5 km	MPC · JPL
63572	2001 QD_{23}	—	August 16, 2001	Socorro	LINEAR	·	1.9 km	MPC · JPL
63573	2001 QG_{23}	—	August 16, 2001	Socorro	LINEAR	·	4.7 km	MPC · JPL
63574	2001 QH_{25}	—	August 16, 2001	Socorro	LINEAR	·	2.3 km	MPC · JPL
63575	2001 QQ_{27}	—	August 16, 2001	Socorro	LINEAR	EUN	3.3 km	MPC · JPL
63576	2001 QS_{27}	—	August 16, 2001	Socorro	LINEAR	·	1.9 km	MPC · JPL
63577	2001 QU_{27}	—	August 16, 2001	Socorro	LINEAR	V	1.8 km	MPC · JPL
63578	2001 QD_{28}	—	August 16, 2001	Socorro	LINEAR	NYS	6.7 km	MPC · JPL
63579	2001 QO_{29}	—	August 16, 2001	Socorro	LINEAR	·	3.5 km	MPC · JPL
63580	2001 QW_{29}	—	August 16, 2001	Socorro	LINEAR	NYS	3.9 km	MPC · JPL
63581	2001 QC_{30}	—	August 16, 2001	Socorro	LINEAR	NYS	2.5 km	MPC · JPL
63582	2001 QL_{30}	—	August 16, 2001	Socorro	LINEAR	·	5.9 km	MPC · JPL
63583	2001 QP_{31}	—	August 16, 2001	Socorro	LINEAR	·	2.1 km	MPC · JPL
63584	2001 QY_{33}	—	August 19, 2001	Ondřejov	P. Kušnirák, P. Pravec	VER	6.2 km	MPC · JPL
63585	2001 QB_{44}	—	August 16, 2001	Socorro	LINEAR	EOS ·	3.9 km	MPC · JPL
63586	2001 QK_{44}	—	August 16, 2001	Socorro	LINEAR	·	5.1 km	MPC · JPL
63587	2001 QH_{47}	—	August 16, 2001	Socorro	LINEAR	·	5.7 km	MPC · JPL
63588	2001 QB_{49}	—	August 16, 2001	Socorro	LINEAR	·	1.4 km	MPC · JPL
63589	2001 QX_{49}	—	August 16, 2001	Socorro	LINEAR	·	4.7 km	MPC · JPL
63590	2001 QM_{59}	—	August 18, 2001	Socorro	LINEAR	NYS	2.0 km	MPC · JPL
63591	2001 QF_{61}	—	August 16, 2001	Socorro	LINEAR	·	8.4 km	MPC · JPL
63592	2001 QM_{61}	—	August 16, 2001	Socorro	LINEAR	(2076)	2.5 km	MPC · JPL
63593	2001 QZ_{62}	—	August 16, 2001	Socorro	LINEAR	V	1.5 km	MPC · JPL
63594	2001 QU_{63}	—	August 16, 2001	Socorro	LINEAR	THM	5.6 km	MPC · JPL
63595	2001 QW_{63}	—	August 16, 2001	Socorro	LINEAR	V	1.2 km	MPC · JPL
63596	2001 QG_{64}	—	August 16, 2001	Socorro	LINEAR	DOR	4.9 km	MPC · JPL
63597	2001 QH_{65}	—	August 16, 2001	Socorro	LINEAR	·	4.6 km	MPC · JPL
63598	2001 QJ_{65}	—	August 17, 2001	Socorro	LINEAR	·	4.7 km	MPC · JPL
63599	2001 QN_{65}	—	August 17, 2001	Socorro	LINEAR	·	6.5 km	MPC · JPL
63600	2001 QY_{65}	—	August 17, 2001	Socorro	LINEAR	EOS	6.5 km	MPC · JPL

== 63601–63700 ==
back to top

Designation			Discovery			Properties		Ref
Permanent	Provisional	Named after	Date	Site	Discoverer(s)	Category	Diam.	Ref
63601	2001 QD_{66}	—	August 17, 2001	Socorro	LINEAR	V	1.9 km	MPC · JPL
63602	2001 QE_{67}	—	August 18, 2001	Socorro	LINEAR	EUN	3.5 km	MPC · JPL
63603	2001 QG_{67}	—	August 18, 2001	Socorro	LINEAR	·	4.6 km	MPC · JPL
63604	2001 QC_{68}	—	August 16, 2001	Kitt Peak	Spacewatch	EUN	5.4 km	MPC · JPL
63605 Budperry	2001 QE_{68}	Budperry	August 20, 2001	Oakley	Wolfe, C.	H	1.3 km	MPC · JPL
63606	2001 QK_{69}	—	August 17, 2001	Socorro	LINEAR	·	6.0 km	MPC · JPL
63607	2001 QG_{70}	—	August 17, 2001	Socorro	LINEAR	·	2.7 km	MPC · JPL
63608	2001 QD_{72}	—	August 21, 2001	Desert Eagle	W. K. Y. Yeung	NYS	2.5 km	MPC · JPL
63609 Françoisecolas	2001 QY_{72}	Françoisecolas	August 20, 2001	Pic du Midi	Pic du Midi	·	5.1 km	MPC · JPL
63610	2001 QT_{75}	—	August 16, 2001	Socorro	LINEAR	(5)	4.3 km	MPC · JPL
63611	2001 QX_{75}	—	August 16, 2001	Socorro	LINEAR	·	2.5 km	MPC · JPL
63612	2001 QK_{76}	—	August 16, 2001	Socorro	LINEAR	·	3.2 km	MPC · JPL
63613	2001 QO_{76}	—	August 16, 2001	Socorro	LINEAR	·	4.6 km	MPC · JPL
63614	2001 QF_{77}	—	August 16, 2001	Socorro	LINEAR	EUN	3.9 km	MPC · JPL
63615	2001 QB_{78}	—	August 16, 2001	Socorro	LINEAR	·	3.0 km	MPC · JPL
63616	2001 QN_{78}	—	August 16, 2001	Socorro	LINEAR	·	5.8 km	MPC · JPL
63617	2001 QO_{78}	—	August 16, 2001	Socorro	LINEAR	slow	2.2 km	MPC · JPL
63618	2001 QP_{78}	—	August 16, 2001	Socorro	LINEAR	NYS	3.3 km	MPC · JPL
63619	2001 QV_{78}	—	August 16, 2001	Socorro	LINEAR	·	2.8 km	MPC · JPL
63620	2001 QW_{78}	—	August 16, 2001	Socorro	LINEAR	·	4.7 km	MPC · JPL
63621	2001 QZ_{78}	—	August 16, 2001	Socorro	LINEAR	NYS	3.5 km	MPC · JPL
63622	2001 QE_{79}	—	August 16, 2001	Socorro	LINEAR	·	7.0 km	MPC · JPL
63623	2001 QN_{79}	—	August 16, 2001	Socorro	LINEAR	·	4.8 km	MPC · JPL
63624	2001 QX_{79}	—	August 16, 2001	Socorro	LINEAR	NYS	2.8 km	MPC · JPL
63625	2001 QC_{80}	—	August 16, 2001	Socorro	LINEAR	·	2.5 km	MPC · JPL
63626	2001 QH_{80}	—	August 16, 2001	Socorro	LINEAR	·	5.5 km	MPC · JPL
63627	2001 QJ_{80}	—	August 16, 2001	Socorro	LINEAR	·	2.7 km	MPC · JPL
63628	2001 QN_{80}	—	August 17, 2001	Socorro	LINEAR	·	7.4 km	MPC · JPL
63629	2001 QU_{80}	—	August 17, 2001	Socorro	LINEAR	EUN	4.9 km	MPC · JPL
63630	2001 QE_{83}	—	August 17, 2001	Socorro	LINEAR	·	3.2 km	MPC · JPL
63631	2001 QY_{83}	—	August 17, 2001	Socorro	LINEAR	·	4.6 km	MPC · JPL
63632	2001 QG_{84}	—	August 17, 2001	Socorro	LINEAR	·	5.1 km	MPC · JPL
63633	2001 QR_{84}	—	August 18, 2001	Socorro	LINEAR	·	2.5 km	MPC · JPL
63634	2001 QU_{86}	—	August 16, 2001	Palomar	NEAT	HNS	2.7 km	MPC · JPL
63635	2001 QM_{88}	—	August 22, 2001	Kitt Peak	Spacewatch	MRX	1.9 km	MPC · JPL
63636	2001 QJ_{90}	—	August 20, 2001	Palomar	NEAT	·	1.8 km	MPC · JPL
63637	2001 QT_{90}	—	August 22, 2001	Socorro	LINEAR	H	2.0 km	MPC · JPL
63638	2001 QM_{92}	—	August 22, 2001	Socorro	LINEAR	EOS	7.1 km	MPC · JPL
63639	2001 QQ_{93}	—	August 22, 2001	Socorro	LINEAR	·	6.6 km	MPC · JPL
63640	2001 QM_{94}	—	August 23, 2001	Desert Eagle	W. K. Y. Yeung	·	1.4 km	MPC · JPL
63641	2001 QE_{97}	—	August 17, 2001	Socorro	LINEAR	EOS	6.2 km	MPC · JPL
63642	2001 QK_{97}	—	August 17, 2001	Socorro	LINEAR	·	3.4 km	MPC · JPL
63643	2001 QC_{99}	—	August 22, 2001	Socorro	LINEAR	·	4.3 km	MPC · JPL
63644	2001 QY_{99}	—	August 22, 2001	Socorro	LINEAR	H	1.2 km	MPC · JPL
63645	2001 QY_{101}	—	August 18, 2001	Socorro	LINEAR	·	1.9 km	MPC · JPL
63646	2001 QA_{102}	—	August 18, 2001	Socorro	LINEAR	·	3.3 km	MPC · JPL
63647	2001 QD_{104}	—	August 20, 2001	Socorro	LINEAR	(3460)	8.2 km	MPC · JPL
63648	2001 QP_{104}	—	August 22, 2001	Socorro	LINEAR	·	2.1 km	MPC · JPL
63649	2001 QT_{105}	—	August 23, 2001	Socorro	LINEAR	·	3.7 km	MPC · JPL
63650	2001 QN_{106}	—	August 23, 2001	Anderson Mesa	LONEOS	·	5.7 km	MPC · JPL
63651	2001 QS_{107}	—	August 18, 2001	Anderson Mesa	LONEOS	·	4.9 km	MPC · JPL
63652	2001 QG_{108}	—	August 23, 2001	Desert Eagle	W. K. Y. Yeung	·	3.6 km	MPC · JPL
63653	2001 QQ_{109}	—	August 21, 2001	Palomar	NEAT	·	4.2 km	MPC · JPL
63654	2001 QD_{113}	—	August 25, 2001	Socorro	LINEAR	·	12 km	MPC · JPL
63655	2001 QV_{113}	—	August 26, 2001	Ondřejov	P. Kušnirák, P. Pravec	·	2.6 km	MPC · JPL
63656	2001 QC_{114}	—	August 17, 2001	Socorro	LINEAR	·	2.4 km	MPC · JPL
63657	2001 QV_{114}	—	August 17, 2001	Socorro	LINEAR	·	2.1 km	MPC · JPL
63658	2001 QJ_{115}	—	August 17, 2001	Socorro	LINEAR	·	7.3 km	MPC · JPL
63659	2001 QM_{116}	—	August 17, 2001	Socorro	LINEAR	·	3.7 km	MPC · JPL
63660	2001 QV_{119}	—	August 18, 2001	Socorro	LINEAR	KOR	4.7 km	MPC · JPL
63661	2001 QC_{120}	—	August 18, 2001	Socorro	LINEAR	·	5.2 km	MPC · JPL
63662	2001 QE_{120}	—	August 18, 2001	Socorro	LINEAR	·	1.9 km	MPC · JPL
63663	2001 QQ_{120}	—	August 19, 2001	Socorro	LINEAR	·	9.7 km	MPC · JPL
63664	2001 QQ_{121}	—	August 19, 2001	Socorro	LINEAR	·	3.9 km	MPC · JPL
63665	2001 QC_{124}	—	August 19, 2001	Socorro	LINEAR	NYS	2.1 km	MPC · JPL
63666	2001 QD_{129}	—	August 20, 2001	Socorro	LINEAR	V	1.6 km	MPC · JPL
63667	2001 QK_{130}	—	August 20, 2001	Socorro	LINEAR	·	5.8 km	MPC · JPL
63668	2001 QP_{131}	—	August 20, 2001	Socorro	LINEAR	·	6.0 km	MPC · JPL
63669	2001 QS_{131}	—	August 20, 2001	Socorro	LINEAR	NYS ·	4.4 km	MPC · JPL
63670	2001 QY_{131}	—	August 20, 2001	Socorro	LINEAR	EOS	5.8 km	MPC · JPL
63671	2001 QK_{132}	—	August 20, 2001	Socorro	LINEAR	EOS	3.7 km	MPC · JPL
63672	2001 QM_{134}	—	August 22, 2001	Socorro	LINEAR	EUN	3.2 km	MPC · JPL
63673	2001 QL_{135}	—	August 22, 2001	Socorro	LINEAR	·	2.2 km	MPC · JPL
63674	2001 QO_{136}	—	August 22, 2001	Socorro	LINEAR	·	3.3 km	MPC · JPL
63675	2001 QY_{137}	—	August 22, 2001	Socorro	LINEAR	V	1.8 km	MPC · JPL
63676	2001 QM_{139}	—	August 22, 2001	Socorro	LINEAR	·	2.4 km	MPC · JPL
63677	2001 QY_{139}	—	August 22, 2001	Socorro	LINEAR	V	2.1 km	MPC · JPL
63678	2001 QL_{140}	—	August 22, 2001	Socorro	LINEAR	EOS	6.2 km	MPC · JPL
63679	2001 QN_{145}	—	August 24, 2001	Kitt Peak	Spacewatch	MAS	1.2 km	MPC · JPL
63680	2001 QD_{147}	—	August 20, 2001	Palomar	NEAT	·	7.8 km	MPC · JPL
63681	2001 QE_{147}	—	August 20, 2001	Palomar	NEAT	·	2.8 km	MPC · JPL
63682	2001 QZ_{147}	—	August 20, 2001	Palomar	NEAT	EUN	3.9 km	MPC · JPL
63683	2001 QJ_{150}	—	August 25, 2001	Palomar	NEAT	·	6.2 km	MPC · JPL
63684	2001 QL_{152}	—	August 25, 2001	Desert Eagle	W. K. Y. Yeung	KOR	4.1 km	MPC · JPL
63685	2001 QT_{152}	—	August 26, 2001	Desert Eagle	W. K. Y. Yeung	·	2.6 km	MPC · JPL
63686	2001 QY_{152}	—	August 26, 2001	Ondřejov	P. Kušnirák	·	1.6 km	MPC · JPL
63687	2001 QH_{154}	—	August 30, 2001	Ondřejov	L. Kotková	·	6.1 km	MPC · JPL
63688	2001 QR_{154}	—	August 28, 2001	Kleť	Kleť	·	5.4 km	MPC · JPL
63689	2001 QK_{155}	—	August 23, 2001	Anderson Mesa	LONEOS	·	1.7 km	MPC · JPL
63690	2001 QY_{156}	—	August 23, 2001	Anderson Mesa	LONEOS	·	3.7 km	MPC · JPL
63691	2001 QY_{157}	—	August 23, 2001	Anderson Mesa	LONEOS	KOR	3.1 km	MPC · JPL
63692	2001 QQ_{160}	—	August 23, 2001	Anderson Mesa	LONEOS	MAS	1.2 km	MPC · JPL
63693	2001 QN_{161}	—	August 23, 2001	Anderson Mesa	LONEOS	·	2.0 km	MPC · JPL
63694	2001 QB_{167}	—	August 24, 2001	Haleakala	NEAT	·	4.7 km	MPC · JPL
63695	2001 QM_{168}	—	August 25, 2001	Palomar	NEAT	·	2.9 km	MPC · JPL
63696	2001 QV_{169}	—	August 22, 2001	Socorro	LINEAR	(2076)	2.0 km	MPC · JPL
63697	2001 QY_{177}	—	August 26, 2001	Haleakala	NEAT	EOS	4.4 km	MPC · JPL
63698	2001 QK_{179}	—	August 28, 2001	Palomar	NEAT	·	7.3 km	MPC · JPL
63699	2001 QG_{181}	—	August 27, 2001	Palomar	NEAT	·	6.5 km	MPC · JPL
63700	2001 QR_{181}	—	August 27, 2001	Palomar	NEAT	(5)	4.0 km	MPC · JPL

== 63701–63800 ==
back to top

Designation			Discovery			Properties		Ref
Permanent	Provisional	Named after	Date	Site	Discoverer(s)	Category	Diam.	Ref
63701	2001 QA_{182}	—	August 30, 2001	Palomar	NEAT	PHO	1.9 km	MPC · JPL
63702	2001 QK_{182}	—	August 29, 2001	Palomar	NEAT	·	5.0 km	MPC · JPL
63703	2001 QB_{185}	—	August 21, 2001	Socorro	LINEAR	·	5.2 km	MPC · JPL
63704	2001 QS_{187}	—	August 21, 2001	Haleakala	NEAT	PHO	2.1 km	MPC · JPL
63705	2001 QJ_{195}	—	August 22, 2001	Socorro	LINEAR	·	4.3 km	MPC · JPL
63706	2001 QS_{196}	—	August 22, 2001	Palomar	NEAT	PHO	2.6 km	MPC · JPL
63707	2001 QX_{197}	—	August 22, 2001	Socorro	LINEAR	·	5.1 km	MPC · JPL
63708	2001 QA_{198}	—	August 22, 2001	Socorro	LINEAR	·	2.2 km	MPC · JPL
63709	2001 QY_{198}	—	August 22, 2001	Socorro	LINEAR	V	1.6 km	MPC · JPL
63710	2001 QC_{200}	—	August 22, 2001	Socorro	LINEAR	·	1.8 km	MPC · JPL
63711	2001 QD_{200}	—	August 22, 2001	Socorro	LINEAR	·	2.1 km	MPC · JPL
63712	2001 QH_{200}	—	August 22, 2001	Palomar	NEAT	MAR	2.6 km	MPC · JPL
63713	2001 QY_{206}	—	August 23, 2001	Anderson Mesa	LONEOS	·	6.8 km	MPC · JPL
63714	2001 QF_{208}	—	August 23, 2001	Anderson Mesa	LONEOS	·	1.2 km	MPC · JPL
63715	2001 QL_{212}	—	August 23, 2001	Anderson Mesa	LONEOS	·	1.7 km	MPC · JPL
63716	2001 QV_{216}	—	August 23, 2001	Anderson Mesa	LONEOS	·	2.7 km	MPC · JPL
63717	2001 QT_{220}	—	August 24, 2001	Anderson Mesa	LONEOS	·	4.7 km	MPC · JPL
63718	2001 QT_{225}	—	August 24, 2001	Anderson Mesa	LONEOS	EOS	4.5 km	MPC · JPL
63719	2001 QV_{225}	—	August 24, 2001	Anderson Mesa	LONEOS	EOS	4.4 km	MPC · JPL
63720	2001 QS_{228}	—	August 24, 2001	Desert Eagle	W. K. Y. Yeung	·	2.3 km	MPC · JPL
63721	2001 QH_{234}	—	August 24, 2001	Socorro	LINEAR	THM	7.1 km	MPC · JPL
63722	2001 QK_{235}	—	August 24, 2001	Socorro	LINEAR	·	7.7 km	MPC · JPL
63723	2001 QN_{235}	—	August 24, 2001	Socorro	LINEAR	·	1.6 km	MPC · JPL
63724	2001 QO_{235}	—	August 24, 2001	Socorro	LINEAR	EOS	5.7 km	MPC · JPL
63725	2001 QP_{235}	—	August 24, 2001	Socorro	LINEAR	EOS	5.0 km	MPC · JPL
63726	2001 QQ_{235}	—	August 24, 2001	Socorro	LINEAR	NEM ·	3.6 km	MPC · JPL
63727	2001 QO_{237}	—	August 24, 2001	Socorro	LINEAR	KOR	3.6 km	MPC · JPL
63728	2001 QW_{237}	—	August 24, 2001	Socorro	LINEAR	NYS	2.4 km	MPC · JPL
63729	2001 QG_{238}	—	August 24, 2001	Socorro	LINEAR	·	3.2 km	MPC · JPL
63730	2001 QB_{239}	—	August 24, 2001	Socorro	LINEAR	·	2.4 km	MPC · JPL
63731	2001 QE_{241}	—	August 24, 2001	Socorro	LINEAR	KOR	4.2 km	MPC · JPL
63732	2001 QR_{241}	—	August 24, 2001	Socorro	LINEAR	·	3.7 km	MPC · JPL
63733	2001 QK_{244}	—	August 24, 2001	Socorro	LINEAR	·	6.6 km	MPC · JPL
63734	2001 QN_{246}	—	August 24, 2001	Socorro	LINEAR	·	2.4 km	MPC · JPL
63735	2001 QQ_{246}	—	August 24, 2001	Socorro	LINEAR	·	7.0 km	MPC · JPL
63736	2001 QF_{249}	—	August 24, 2001	Socorro	LINEAR	·	5.6 km	MPC · JPL
63737	2001 QN_{249}	—	August 24, 2001	Socorro	LINEAR	·	2.2 km	MPC · JPL
63738	2001 QA_{251}	—	August 24, 2001	Haleakala	NEAT	·	3.0 km	MPC · JPL
63739	2001 QD_{251}	—	August 25, 2001	Socorro	LINEAR	·	2.4 km	MPC · JPL
63740	2001 QO_{251}	—	August 25, 2001	Socorro	LINEAR	·	2.8 km	MPC · JPL
63741	2001 QV_{254}	—	August 25, 2001	Anderson Mesa	LONEOS	·	1.9 km	MPC · JPL
63742	2001 QK_{256}	—	August 25, 2001	Socorro	LINEAR	·	5.8 km	MPC · JPL
63743	2001 QL_{256}	—	August 25, 2001	Socorro	LINEAR	·	4.8 km	MPC · JPL
63744	2001 QT_{256}	—	August 25, 2001	Socorro	LINEAR	(5)	2.8 km	MPC · JPL
63745	2001 QU_{258}	—	August 25, 2001	Socorro	LINEAR	·	1.9 km	MPC · JPL
63746	2001 QF_{263}	—	August 25, 2001	Socorro	LINEAR	·	2.5 km	MPC · JPL
63747	2001 QG_{263}	—	August 25, 2001	Socorro	LINEAR	·	4.0 km	MPC · JPL
63748	2001 QH_{263}	—	August 25, 2001	Desert Eagle	W. K. Y. Yeung	NYS	2.8 km	MPC · JPL
63749	2001 QU_{263}	—	August 25, 2001	Anderson Mesa	LONEOS	·	2.6 km	MPC · JPL
63750	2001 QG_{264}	—	August 25, 2001	Anderson Mesa	LONEOS	·	2.0 km	MPC · JPL
63751	2001 QX_{264}	—	August 26, 2001	Haleakala	NEAT	KOR	2.8 km	MPC · JPL
63752	2001 QA_{265}	—	August 26, 2001	Socorro	LINEAR	·	4.9 km	MPC · JPL
63753	2001 QE_{265}	—	August 26, 2001	Socorro	LINEAR	NYS	3.4 km	MPC · JPL
63754	2001 QP_{267}	—	August 20, 2001	Palomar	NEAT	H	1.6 km	MPC · JPL
63755	2001 QZ_{267}	—	August 20, 2001	Socorro	LINEAR	·	6.2 km	MPC · JPL
63756	2001 QM_{269}	—	August 20, 2001	Haleakala	NEAT	·	2.5 km	MPC · JPL
63757	2001 QK_{277}	—	August 19, 2001	Socorro	LINEAR	TEL	3.5 km	MPC · JPL
63758	2001 QP_{277}	—	August 19, 2001	Socorro	LINEAR	·	10 km	MPC · JPL
63759	2001 QB_{280}	—	August 19, 2001	Socorro	LINEAR	·	7.7 km	MPC · JPL
63760	2001 QP_{282}	—	August 19, 2001	Anderson Mesa	LONEOS	·	1.9 km	MPC · JPL
63761	2001 QR_{282}	—	August 19, 2001	Anderson Mesa	LONEOS	V	1.7 km	MPC · JPL
63762	2001 QX_{282}	—	August 19, 2001	Haleakala	NEAT	H	1.4 km	MPC · JPL
63763	2001 QB_{283}	—	August 18, 2001	Palomar	NEAT	WIT	2.8 km	MPC · JPL
63764	2001 QT_{283}	—	August 18, 2001	Anderson Mesa	LONEOS	NYS	2.4 km	MPC · JPL
63765	2001 QM_{284}	—	August 18, 2001	Anderson Mesa	LONEOS	·	2.7 km	MPC · JPL
63766	2001 QQ_{284}	—	August 30, 2001	Palomar	NEAT	·	3.2 km	MPC · JPL
63767	2001 QF_{291}	—	August 16, 2001	Socorro	LINEAR	(5)	3.6 km	MPC · JPL
63768	2001 QP_{291}	—	August 16, 2001	Socorro	LINEAR	(5)	2.4 km	MPC · JPL
63769	2001 QU_{291}	—	August 16, 2001	Socorro	LINEAR	·	5.5 km	MPC · JPL
63770	2001 QM_{293}	—	August 25, 2001	Bergisch Gladbach	W. Bickel	(5)	3.0 km	MPC · JPL
63771	2001 QA_{294}	—	August 24, 2001	Anderson Mesa	LONEOS	·	5.5 km	MPC · JPL
63772	2001 QO_{295}	—	August 24, 2001	Anderson Mesa	LONEOS	·	3.9 km	MPC · JPL
63773	2001 QP_{295}	—	August 24, 2001	Socorro	LINEAR	MAS	2.2 km	MPC · JPL
63774	2001 QX_{295}	—	August 24, 2001	Socorro	LINEAR	·	2.0 km	MPC · JPL
63775	2001 QH_{296}	—	August 24, 2001	Socorro	LINEAR	·	5.8 km	MPC · JPL
63776	2001 QF_{297}	—	August 24, 2001	Anderson Mesa	LONEOS	·	5.9 km	MPC · JPL
63777	2001 RD_{1}	—	September 7, 2001	Socorro	LINEAR	·	4.2 km	MPC · JPL
63778	2001 RY_{1}	—	September 7, 2001	Socorro	LINEAR	·	5.3 km	MPC · JPL
63779	2001 RX_{3}	—	September 7, 2001	Socorro	LINEAR	(7744)	3.0 km	MPC · JPL
63780	2001 RW_{4}	—	September 8, 2001	Socorro	LINEAR	SUL	3.4 km	MPC · JPL
63781	2001 RL_{5}	—	September 8, 2001	Socorro	LINEAR	·	3.1 km	MPC · JPL
63782	2001 RU_{6}	—	September 10, 2001	Desert Eagle	W. K. Y. Yeung	·	2.1 km	MPC · JPL
63783	2001 RK_{8}	—	September 8, 2001	Socorro	LINEAR	HOF	4.9 km	MPC · JPL
63784	2001 RK_{9}	—	September 8, 2001	Socorro	LINEAR	PHO	2.9 km	MPC · JPL
63785	2001 RM_{11}	—	September 10, 2001	Desert Eagle	W. K. Y. Yeung	KOR	3.2 km	MPC · JPL
63786	2001 RO_{11}	—	September 10, 2001	Desert Eagle	W. K. Y. Yeung	·	4.6 km	MPC · JPL
63787 Michelmaurette	2001 RW_{16}	Michelmaurette	September 11, 2001	Desert Eagle	W. K. Y. Yeung	GEF	2.3 km	MPC · JPL
63788 Jonlarsen	2001 RL_{17}	Jonlarsen	September 11, 2001	Desert Eagle	W. K. Y. Yeung	·	2.3 km	MPC · JPL
63789	2001 RD_{18}	—	September 7, 2001	Socorro	LINEAR	H	1.0 km	MPC · JPL
63790	2001 RE_{18}	—	September 7, 2001	Socorro	LINEAR	·	1.7 km	MPC · JPL
63791	2001 RG_{18}	—	September 7, 2001	Socorro	LINEAR	·	2.7 km	MPC · JPL
63792	2001 RY_{18}	—	September 7, 2001	Socorro	LINEAR	·	3.8 km	MPC · JPL
63793	2001 RF_{19}	—	September 7, 2001	Socorro	LINEAR	KOR	3.1 km	MPC · JPL
63794	2001 RH_{20}	—	September 7, 2001	Socorro	LINEAR	·	1.8 km	MPC · JPL
63795	2001 RL_{21}	—	September 7, 2001	Socorro	LINEAR	KOR	2.8 km	MPC · JPL
63796	2001 RJ_{23}	—	September 7, 2001	Socorro	LINEAR	·	3.6 km	MPC · JPL
63797	2001 RX_{25}	—	September 7, 2001	Socorro	LINEAR	AGN	3.5 km	MPC · JPL
63798	2001 RL_{26}	—	September 7, 2001	Socorro	LINEAR	·	2.2 km	MPC · JPL
63799	2001 RS_{26}	—	September 7, 2001	Socorro	LINEAR	·	6.2 km	MPC · JPL
63800	2001 RJ_{27}	—	September 7, 2001	Socorro	LINEAR	·	5.6 km	MPC · JPL

== 63801–63900 ==
back to top

Designation			Discovery			Properties		Ref
Permanent	Provisional	Named after	Date	Site	Discoverer(s)	Category	Diam.	Ref
63801	2001 RM_{27}	—	September 7, 2001	Socorro	LINEAR	·	8.5 km	MPC · JPL
63802	2001 RV_{28}	—	September 7, 2001	Socorro	LINEAR	·	3.4 km	MPC · JPL
63803	2001 RC_{29}	—	September 7, 2001	Socorro	LINEAR	·	1.5 km	MPC · JPL
63804	2001 RA_{31}	—	September 7, 2001	Socorro	LINEAR	·	2.7 km	MPC · JPL
63805	2001 RV_{36}	—	September 8, 2001	Socorro	LINEAR	·	1.6 km	MPC · JPL
63806	2001 RG_{37}	—	September 8, 2001	Socorro	LINEAR	·	5.5 km	MPC · JPL
63807	2001 RZ_{38}	—	September 9, 2001	Socorro	LINEAR	·	7.8 km	MPC · JPL
63808	2001 RF_{44}	—	September 12, 2001	Palomar	NEAT	·	2.1 km	MPC · JPL
63809	2001 RU_{44}	—	September 13, 2001	Palomar	NEAT	V	2.1 km	MPC · JPL
63810	2001 RL_{45}	—	September 14, 2001	Palomar	NEAT	THM	7.2 km	MPC · JPL
63811	2001 RU_{45}	—	September 14, 2001	Palomar	NEAT	·	2.4 km	MPC · JPL
63812	2001 RW_{45}	—	September 14, 2001	Palomar	NEAT	·	3.3 km	MPC · JPL
63813	2001 RX_{45}	—	September 14, 2001	Palomar	NEAT	·	2.4 km	MPC · JPL
63814	2001 RY_{45}	—	September 15, 2001	Ametlla de Mar	J. Nomen	ERI	4.4 km	MPC · JPL
63815	2001 RX_{46}	—	September 11, 2001	Socorro	LINEAR	H	1.3 km	MPC · JPL
63816	2001 RC_{48}	—	September 10, 2001	Desert Eagle	W. K. Y. Yeung	KOR	3.6 km	MPC · JPL
63817	2001 RP_{60}	—	September 12, 2001	Socorro	LINEAR	·	2.3 km	MPC · JPL
63818	2001 RV_{63}	—	September 11, 2001	Desert Eagle	W. K. Y. Yeung	·	2.3 km	MPC · JPL
63819	2001 RJ_{64}	—	September 10, 2001	Socorro	LINEAR	·	4.9 km	MPC · JPL
63820	2001 RQ_{64}	—	September 10, 2001	Socorro	LINEAR	·	2.8 km	MPC · JPL
63821	2001 RF_{65}	—	September 10, 2001	Socorro	LINEAR	EOS	5.8 km	MPC · JPL
63822	2001 RQ_{68}	—	September 10, 2001	Socorro	LINEAR	·	6.1 km	MPC · JPL
63823	2001 RL_{70}	—	September 10, 2001	Socorro	LINEAR	V	1.1 km	MPC · JPL
63824	2001 RZ_{70}	—	September 10, 2001	Socorro	LINEAR	V	1.9 km	MPC · JPL
63825	2001 RA_{71}	—	September 10, 2001	Socorro	LINEAR	·	1.8 km	MPC · JPL
63826	2001 RD_{71}	—	September 10, 2001	Socorro	LINEAR	·	2.0 km	MPC · JPL
63827	2001 RP_{71}	—	September 10, 2001	Socorro	LINEAR	·	2.1 km	MPC · JPL
63828	2001 RS_{71}	—	September 10, 2001	Socorro	LINEAR	·	2.6 km	MPC · JPL
63829	2001 RM_{72}	—	September 10, 2001	Socorro	LINEAR	·	4.7 km	MPC · JPL
63830	2001 RO_{72}	—	September 10, 2001	Socorro	LINEAR	·	4.9 km	MPC · JPL
63831	2001 RY_{73}	—	September 10, 2001	Socorro	LINEAR	·	1.9 km	MPC · JPL
63832	2001 RL_{74}	—	September 10, 2001	Socorro	LINEAR	TIR	6.8 km	MPC · JPL
63833	2001 RW_{74}	—	September 10, 2001	Socorro	LINEAR	HOF	6.1 km	MPC · JPL
63834	2001 RU_{75}	—	September 10, 2001	Socorro	LINEAR	·	2.6 km	MPC · JPL
63835	2001 RW_{75}	—	September 10, 2001	Socorro	LINEAR	·	2.2 km	MPC · JPL
63836	2001 RY_{75}	—	September 10, 2001	Socorro	LINEAR	·	4.3 km	MPC · JPL
63837	2001 RA_{76}	—	September 10, 2001	Socorro	LINEAR	NYS	2.9 km	MPC · JPL
63838	2001 RC_{76}	—	September 10, 2001	Socorro	LINEAR	·	1.9 km	MPC · JPL
63839	2001 RM_{76}	—	September 10, 2001	Socorro	LINEAR	·	3.7 km	MPC · JPL
63840	2001 RS_{76}	—	September 10, 2001	Socorro	LINEAR	·	2.5 km	MPC · JPL
63841	2001 RX_{76}	—	September 10, 2001	Socorro	LINEAR	·	3.8 km	MPC · JPL
63842	2001 RD_{77}	—	September 10, 2001	Socorro	LINEAR	·	4.4 km	MPC · JPL
63843	2001 RO_{77}	—	September 10, 2001	Socorro	LINEAR	(5)	4.5 km	MPC · JPL
63844	2001 RK_{80}	—	September 12, 2001	Palomar	NEAT	·	2.5 km	MPC · JPL
63845	2001 RV_{81}	—	September 14, 2001	Palomar	NEAT	EUN	3.9 km	MPC · JPL
63846	2001 RY_{82}	—	September 11, 2001	Anderson Mesa	LONEOS	RAF	2.4 km	MPC · JPL
63847	2001 RU_{83}	—	September 11, 2001	Anderson Mesa	LONEOS	·	1.1 km	MPC · JPL
63848	2001 RE_{86}	—	September 11, 2001	Anderson Mesa	LONEOS	·	5.9 km	MPC · JPL
63849	2001 RV_{86}	—	September 11, 2001	Anderson Mesa	LONEOS	·	2.6 km	MPC · JPL
63850	2001 RY_{86}	—	September 11, 2001	Anderson Mesa	LONEOS	·	2.5 km	MPC · JPL
63851	2001 RH_{87}	—	September 11, 2001	Anderson Mesa	LONEOS	·	2.5 km	MPC · JPL
63852	2001 RZ_{87}	—	September 11, 2001	Anderson Mesa	LONEOS	KOR	3.8 km	MPC · JPL
63853	2001 RT_{88}	—	September 11, 2001	Anderson Mesa	LONEOS	·	2.2 km	MPC · JPL
63854	2001 RU_{88}	—	September 11, 2001	Anderson Mesa	LONEOS	·	3.4 km	MPC · JPL
63855	2001 RB_{90}	—	September 11, 2001	Anderson Mesa	LONEOS	·	2.2 km	MPC · JPL
63856	2001 RD_{91}	—	September 11, 2001	Anderson Mesa	LONEOS	·	4.5 km	MPC · JPL
63857	2001 RZ_{91}	—	September 11, 2001	Anderson Mesa	LONEOS	PAD	4.3 km	MPC · JPL
63858	2001 RN_{92}	—	September 11, 2001	Anderson Mesa	LONEOS	·	1.2 km	MPC · JPL
63859	2001 RR_{93}	—	September 11, 2001	Anderson Mesa	LONEOS	·	1.9 km	MPC · JPL
63860	2001 RS_{93}	—	September 11, 2001	Anderson Mesa	LONEOS	·	4.3 km	MPC · JPL
63861	2001 RU_{93}	—	September 11, 2001	Anderson Mesa	LONEOS	·	2.5 km	MPC · JPL
63862 Amyledbetter	2001 RL_{100}	Amyledbetter	September 12, 2001	Socorro	LINEAR	THM	5.3 km	MPC · JPL
63863	2001 RM_{102}	—	September 12, 2001	Socorro	LINEAR	·	1.2 km	MPC · JPL
63864	2001 RX_{107}	—	September 12, 2001	Socorro	LINEAR	·	2.2 km	MPC · JPL
63865	2001 RC_{109}	—	September 12, 2001	Socorro	LINEAR	·	3.5 km	MPC · JPL
63866	2001 RB_{111}	—	September 12, 2001	Socorro	LINEAR	·	6.0 km	MPC · JPL
63867	2001 RN_{115}	—	September 12, 2001	Socorro	LINEAR	·	6.0 km	MPC · JPL
63868	2001 RC_{119}	—	September 12, 2001	Socorro	LINEAR	·	1.3 km	MPC · JPL
63869	2001 RN_{121}	—	September 12, 2001	Socorro	LINEAR	(1338) (FLO)	1.3 km	MPC · JPL
63870	2001 RN_{123}	—	September 12, 2001	Socorro	LINEAR	NYS	2.6 km	MPC · JPL
63871	2001 RB_{133}	—	September 12, 2001	Socorro	LINEAR	·	3.5 km	MPC · JPL
63872	2001 RT_{134}	—	September 12, 2001	Socorro	LINEAR	(5)	2.9 km	MPC · JPL
63873	2001 RF_{135}	—	September 12, 2001	Socorro	LINEAR	·	4.1 km	MPC · JPL
63874	2001 RT_{135}	—	September 12, 2001	Socorro	LINEAR	(5)	3.0 km	MPC · JPL
63875	2001 RY_{135}	—	September 12, 2001	Socorro	LINEAR	·	7.6 km	MPC · JPL
63876	2001 RK_{140}	—	September 12, 2001	Socorro	LINEAR	·	6.4 km	MPC · JPL
63877	2001 RA_{141}	—	September 12, 2001	Socorro	LINEAR	·	2.5 km	MPC · JPL
63878	2001 RH_{141}	—	September 12, 2001	Socorro	LINEAR	PHO	2.8 km	MPC · JPL
63879	2001 RM_{142}	—	September 13, 2001	Palomar	NEAT	·	3.6 km	MPC · JPL
63880	2001 RX_{142}	—	September 14, 2001	Palomar	NEAT	DOR	8.0 km	MPC · JPL
63881	2001 RD_{145}	—	September 7, 2001	Anderson Mesa	LONEOS	·	2.1 km	MPC · JPL
63882	2001 RX_{152}	—	September 11, 2001	Socorro	LINEAR	·	4.7 km	MPC · JPL
63883	2001 SO	—	September 16, 2001	Fountain Hills	C. W. Juels, P. R. Holvorcem	KOR	5.0 km	MPC · JPL
63884	2001 SF_{1}	—	September 17, 2001	Desert Eagle	W. K. Y. Yeung	·	3.4 km	MPC · JPL
63885	2001 SU_{2}	—	September 17, 2001	Desert Eagle	W. K. Y. Yeung	·	2.4 km	MPC · JPL
63886	2001 SY_{2}	—	September 17, 2001	Desert Eagle	W. K. Y. Yeung	V	1.5 km	MPC · JPL
63887	2001 SH_{3}	—	September 17, 2001	Desert Eagle	W. K. Y. Yeung	·	13 km	MPC · JPL
63888	2001 SJ_{3}	—	September 17, 2001	Desert Eagle	W. K. Y. Yeung	HYG	6.3 km	MPC · JPL
63889	2001 SK_{3}	—	September 17, 2001	Desert Eagle	W. K. Y. Yeung	KOR	3.1 km	MPC · JPL
63890	2001 SU_{3}	—	September 16, 2001	Socorro	LINEAR	·	1.8 km	MPC · JPL
63891	2001 SN_{4}	—	September 18, 2001	Goodricke-Pigott	R. A. Tucker	LUT	10 km	MPC · JPL
63892	2001 SX_{4}	—	September 18, 2001	Fountain Hills	C. W. Juels, P. R. Holvorcem	INA	12 km	MPC · JPL
63893	2001 SY_{4}	—	September 18, 2001	Fountain Hills	Hills, Fountain	·	9.1 km	MPC · JPL
63894	2001 SN_{5}	—	September 16, 2001	Socorro	LINEAR	·	2.4 km	MPC · JPL
63895	2001 SZ_{5}	—	September 18, 2001	Ondřejov	P. Kušnirák	·	9.1 km	MPC · JPL
63896	2001 SE_{9}	—	September 19, 2001	Fountain Hills	C. W. Juels, P. R. Holvorcem	·	2.1 km	MPC · JPL
63897 Ofunato	2001 SM_{9}	Ofunato	September 18, 2001	Bisei SG Center	BATTeRS	·	2.1 km	MPC · JPL
63898	2001 SL_{10}	—	September 19, 2001	Needville	Needville	·	4.1 km	MPC · JPL
63899	2001 SG_{12}	—	September 16, 2001	Socorro	LINEAR	·	2.8 km	MPC · JPL
63900	2001 SB_{14}	—	September 16, 2001	Socorro	LINEAR	·	3.9 km	MPC · JPL

== 63901–64000 ==
back to top

Designation			Discovery			Properties		Ref
Permanent	Provisional	Named after	Date	Site	Discoverer(s)	Category	Diam.	Ref
63901	2001 SJ_{14}	—	September 16, 2001	Socorro	LINEAR	VER	7.2 km	MPC · JPL
63902	2001 SZ_{14}	—	September 16, 2001	Socorro	LINEAR	·	2.7 km	MPC · JPL
63903	2001 SM_{17}	—	September 16, 2001	Socorro	LINEAR	THM	7.1 km	MPC · JPL
63904	2001 SR_{17}	—	September 16, 2001	Socorro	LINEAR	·	1.3 km	MPC · JPL
63905	2001 SF_{18}	—	September 16, 2001	Socorro	LINEAR	·	1.8 km	MPC · JPL
63906	2001 SN_{19}	—	September 16, 2001	Socorro	LINEAR	·	4.4 km	MPC · JPL
63907	2001 SJ_{20}	—	September 16, 2001	Socorro	LINEAR	·	2.1 km	MPC · JPL
63908	2001 SM_{20}	—	September 16, 2001	Socorro	LINEAR	KOR · fast	3.5 km	MPC · JPL
63909	2001 SU_{22}	—	September 16, 2001	Socorro	LINEAR	PAD	3.5 km	MPC · JPL
63910	2001 SQ_{30}	—	September 16, 2001	Socorro	LINEAR	·	4.1 km	MPC · JPL
63911	2001 SV_{30}	—	September 16, 2001	Socorro	LINEAR	·	7.2 km	MPC · JPL
63912	2001 SB_{31}	—	September 16, 2001	Socorro	LINEAR	·	2.2 km	MPC · JPL
63913	2001 SG_{32}	—	September 16, 2001	Socorro	LINEAR	·	5.0 km	MPC · JPL
63914	2001 SP_{33}	—	September 16, 2001	Socorro	LINEAR	NYS	1.9 km	MPC · JPL
63915	2001 SG_{34}	—	September 16, 2001	Socorro	LINEAR	·	2.3 km	MPC · JPL
63916	2001 SE_{35}	—	September 16, 2001	Socorro	LINEAR	·	3.8 km	MPC · JPL
63917	2001 SJ_{37}	—	September 16, 2001	Socorro	LINEAR	KOR	3.4 km	MPC · JPL
63918	2001 SU_{37}	—	September 16, 2001	Socorro	LINEAR	·	7.9 km	MPC · JPL
63919	2001 SR_{39}	—	September 16, 2001	Socorro	LINEAR	·	2.2 km	MPC · JPL
63920	2001 SC_{40}	—	September 16, 2001	Socorro	LINEAR	·	1.5 km	MPC · JPL
63921	2001 SK_{40}	—	September 16, 2001	Socorro	LINEAR	·	1.7 km	MPC · JPL
63922	2001 SQ_{40}	—	September 16, 2001	Socorro	LINEAR	·	5.2 km	MPC · JPL
63923	2001 SV_{41}	—	September 16, 2001	Socorro	LINEAR	L5	16 km	MPC · JPL
63924	2001 SO_{42}	—	September 16, 2001	Socorro	LINEAR	MAS	1.3 km	MPC · JPL
63925	2001 SW_{44}	—	September 16, 2001	Socorro	LINEAR	·	5.7 km	MPC · JPL
63926	2001 SQ_{45}	—	September 16, 2001	Socorro	LINEAR	·	6.1 km	MPC · JPL
63927	2001 SU_{45}	—	September 16, 2001	Socorro	LINEAR	·	2.2 km	MPC · JPL
63928	2001 SY_{46}	—	September 16, 2001	Socorro	LINEAR	·	2.3 km	MPC · JPL
63929	2001 ST_{47}	—	September 16, 2001	Socorro	LINEAR	·	2.7 km	MPC · JPL
63930	2001 SZ_{47}	—	September 16, 2001	Socorro	LINEAR	V	1.3 km	MPC · JPL
63931	2001 SH_{48}	—	September 16, 2001	Socorro	LINEAR	·	2.2 km	MPC · JPL
63932	2001 SZ_{48}	—	September 16, 2001	Socorro	LINEAR	EOS	3.3 km	MPC · JPL
63933	2001 SA_{52}	—	September 16, 2001	Socorro	LINEAR	PAD	6.7 km	MPC · JPL
63934	2001 SQ_{53}	—	September 16, 2001	Socorro	LINEAR	·	1.8 km	MPC · JPL
63935	2001 SV_{53}	—	September 16, 2001	Socorro	LINEAR	·	3.2 km	MPC · JPL
63936	2001 SA_{54}	—	September 16, 2001	Socorro	LINEAR	EOS	6.3 km	MPC · JPL
63937	2001 SB_{54}	—	September 16, 2001	Socorro	LINEAR	EUN	2.3 km	MPC · JPL
63938	2001 SE_{54}	—	September 16, 2001	Socorro	LINEAR	·	1.5 km	MPC · JPL
63939	2001 SD_{55}	—	September 16, 2001	Socorro	LINEAR	slow	1.6 km	MPC · JPL
63940	2001 SR_{55}	—	September 16, 2001	Socorro	LINEAR	·	6.8 km	MPC · JPL
63941	2001 SP_{56}	—	September 16, 2001	Socorro	LINEAR	·	1.8 km	MPC · JPL
63942	2001 SQ_{56}	—	September 16, 2001	Socorro	LINEAR	·	7.8 km	MPC · JPL
63943	2001 SR_{56}	—	September 16, 2001	Socorro	LINEAR	·	4.5 km	MPC · JPL
63944	2001 SQ_{57}	—	September 17, 2001	Socorro	LINEAR	NYS	3.2 km	MPC · JPL
63945	2001 ST_{57}	—	September 17, 2001	Socorro	LINEAR	·	5.2 km	MPC · JPL
63946	2001 SC_{58}	—	September 17, 2001	Socorro	LINEAR	NYS	1.6 km	MPC · JPL
63947	2001 ST_{58}	—	September 17, 2001	Socorro	LINEAR	·	2.2 km	MPC · JPL
63948	2001 SL_{59}	—	September 17, 2001	Socorro	LINEAR	·	4.3 km	MPC · JPL
63949	2001 SX_{60}	—	September 17, 2001	Socorro	LINEAR	·	1.4 km	MPC · JPL
63950	2001 SG_{61}	—	September 17, 2001	Socorro	LINEAR	MAS	2.0 km	MPC · JPL
63951	2001 SP_{62}	—	September 17, 2001	Socorro	LINEAR	THM	4.5 km	MPC · JPL
63952	2001 SU_{64}	—	September 17, 2001	Socorro	LINEAR	·	4.5 km	MPC · JPL
63953	2001 SY_{64}	—	September 17, 2001	Socorro	LINEAR	KOR	3.2 km	MPC · JPL
63954	2001 SB_{65}	—	September 17, 2001	Socorro	LINEAR	KOR	3.3 km	MPC · JPL
63955	2001 SP_{65}	—	September 17, 2001	Socorro	LINEAR	L5	22 km	MPC · JPL
63956	2001 SJ_{67}	—	September 17, 2001	Socorro	LINEAR	V	1.3 km	MPC · JPL
63957	2001 SS_{67}	—	September 17, 2001	Socorro	LINEAR	·	1.9 km	MPC · JPL
63958	2001 SV_{67}	—	September 17, 2001	Socorro	LINEAR	(2076)	2.7 km	MPC · JPL
63959	2001 SW_{67}	—	September 17, 2001	Socorro	LINEAR	·	4.5 km	MPC · JPL
63960	2001 SG_{68}	—	September 17, 2001	Socorro	LINEAR	·	7.2 km	MPC · JPL
63961	2001 SK_{68}	—	September 17, 2001	Socorro	LINEAR	MAR	2.5 km	MPC · JPL
63962	2001 SS_{68}	—	September 17, 2001	Socorro	LINEAR	·	1.4 km	MPC · JPL
63963	2001 SZ_{68}	—	September 17, 2001	Socorro	LINEAR	·	2.1 km	MPC · JPL
63964	2001 SM_{69}	—	September 17, 2001	Socorro	LINEAR	·	2.7 km	MPC · JPL
63965	2001 SV_{70}	—	September 17, 2001	Socorro	LINEAR	·	2.9 km	MPC · JPL
63966	2001 SY_{70}	—	September 17, 2001	Socorro	LINEAR	slow	3.6 km	MPC · JPL
63967	2001 SF_{71}	—	September 17, 2001	Socorro	LINEAR	V	1.9 km	MPC · JPL
63968	2001 SG_{71}	—	September 17, 2001	Socorro	LINEAR	·	1.9 km	MPC · JPL
63969	2001 SL_{71}	—	September 17, 2001	Socorro	LINEAR	·	5.2 km	MPC · JPL
63970	2001 SG_{72}	—	September 17, 2001	Socorro	LINEAR	V	2.1 km	MPC · JPL
63971	2001 SV_{72}	—	September 17, 2001	Socorro	LINEAR	·	3.8 km	MPC · JPL
63972	2001 SB_{73}	—	September 17, 2001	Socorro	LINEAR	·	1.7 km	MPC · JPL
63973	2001 SS_{75}	—	September 19, 2001	Anderson Mesa	LONEOS	CYB	8.3 km	MPC · JPL
63974	2001 SB_{77}	—	September 17, 2001	Socorro	LINEAR	·	1.5 km	MPC · JPL
63975	2001 SH_{77}	—	September 17, 2001	Socorro	LINEAR	·	1.9 km	MPC · JPL
63976	2001 SM_{78}	—	September 19, 2001	Socorro	LINEAR	·	1.9 km	MPC · JPL
63977	2001 SQ_{79}	—	September 20, 2001	Socorro	LINEAR	HYG	8.2 km	MPC · JPL
63978	2001 SE_{83}	—	September 20, 2001	Socorro	LINEAR	·	1.3 km	MPC · JPL
63979	2001 SC_{86}	—	September 20, 2001	Socorro	LINEAR	·	5.8 km	MPC · JPL
63980	2001 SW_{92}	—	September 20, 2001	Socorro	LINEAR	·	2.3 km	MPC · JPL
63981	2001 SA_{95}	—	September 20, 2001	Socorro	LINEAR	NYS	2.2 km	MPC · JPL
63982	2001 SR_{104}	—	September 20, 2001	Socorro	LINEAR	·	1.4 km	MPC · JPL
63983	2001 SM_{105}	—	September 20, 2001	Socorro	LINEAR	EUN	3.9 km	MPC · JPL
63984	2001 SP_{105}	—	September 20, 2001	Socorro	LINEAR	·	2.2 km	MPC · JPL
63985	2001 SQ_{105}	—	September 20, 2001	Socorro	LINEAR	·	3.3 km	MPC · JPL
63986	2001 SE_{106}	—	September 20, 2001	Socorro	LINEAR	·	1.9 km	MPC · JPL
63987	2001 SP_{106}	—	September 20, 2001	Socorro	LINEAR	HNS	3.0 km	MPC · JPL
63988	2001 SF_{107}	—	September 20, 2001	Socorro	LINEAR	V	1.5 km	MPC · JPL
63989	2001 SJ_{107}	—	September 20, 2001	Socorro	LINEAR	EUN	4.1 km	MPC · JPL
63990	2001 SA_{108}	—	September 20, 2001	Socorro	LINEAR	EOS	4.9 km	MPC · JPL
63991	2001 SB_{108}	—	September 20, 2001	Socorro	LINEAR	·	10 km	MPC · JPL
63992	2001 SY_{108}	—	September 20, 2001	Socorro	LINEAR	·	3.7 km	MPC · JPL
63993	2001 SO_{109}	—	September 20, 2001	Socorro	LINEAR	·	3.3 km	MPC · JPL
63994	2001 SQ_{109}	—	September 20, 2001	Socorro	LINEAR	·	4.2 km	MPC · JPL
63995	2001 SF_{110}	—	September 20, 2001	Socorro	LINEAR	·	3.6 km	MPC · JPL
63996	2001 SU_{110}	—	September 20, 2001	Socorro	LINEAR	V	1.7 km	MPC · JPL
63997	2001 SX_{110}	—	September 20, 2001	Socorro	LINEAR	·	2.8 km	MPC · JPL
63998	2001 SL_{111}	—	September 20, 2001	Socorro	LINEAR	·	7.6 km	MPC · JPL
63999	2001 SD_{113}	—	September 18, 2001	Desert Eagle	W. K. Y. Yeung	·	5.9 km	MPC · JPL
64000	2001 SD_{115}	—	September 20, 2001	Desert Eagle	W. K. Y. Yeung	·	4.2 km	MPC · JPL

back to top

== See also ==
- Meanings of minor-planet names: 63001–64000
