= 63305 Bobkepple =

Asteroid

Discovery
- Discovered by: D. Healy
- Discovery site: Junk Bond Obs.
- Discovery date: 17 March 2001

Designations
- Named after: George "Bob" Kepple (deep-sky astronomer)
- Alternative designations: 2001 FE
- Minor planet category: main-belt · (outer); Hygiea

Orbital characteristics
- Epoch 23 March 2018 (JD 2458200.5)
- Uncertainty parameter 0
- Observation arc: 21.90 yr (7,998 days)
- Aphelion: 3.6936 AU
- Perihelion: 2.7077 AU
- Semi-major axis: 3.2006 AU
- Eccentricity: 0.1540
- Orbital period (sidereal): 5.73 yr (2,091 days)
- Mean anomaly: 221.60°
- Mean motion: 0° 10^{m} 19.56^{s} / day
- Inclination: 5.5602°
- Longitude of ascending node: 179.85°
- Argument of perihelion: 135.54°

Physical characteristics
- Mean diameter: 6.216±0.181 km
- Geometric albedo: 0.055±0.004
- Absolute magnitude (H): 14.8

63305 Bobkepple (provisional designation 2001 FE) is a carbonaceous Hygiean asteroid from the outer regions of the asteroid belt, approximately 6 kilometers (3.7 miles) in diameter. It was discovered on 17 March 2001, by astronomer David Healy at the Junk Bond Observatory in Arizona, United States. The asteroid was named after Bob Kepple, co-author of The Night Sky Observer's Guide.

== Orbit and classification ==
Bobkepple is a member of the Hygiea family (601), a large family of carbonaceous outer-belt asteroids, named after 10 Hygiea, the main belt's fourth-largest asteroid. It orbits the Sun in the outer main-belt at a distance of 2.7–3.7 AU once every 5 years and 9 months (2,091 days). Its orbit has an eccentricity of 0.15 and an inclination of 6° with respect to the ecliptic.

The body's observation arc begins with a precovery image taken by Spacewatch in March 1995, six years prior to its official discovery observation at Junk Bond Observatory.

== Physical characteristics ==
=== Rotation period ===
As of 2017, no rotational lightcurve of Bobkepple has been obtained from photometric observations. The asteroid's rotation period, spin axis and shape remains unknown.

=== Diameter and albedo ===
According to the survey carried out by the NEOWISE mission of NASA's Wide-field Infrared Survey Explorer, Bobkepple measures 6.216 kilometers in diameter and its surface has an albedo of 0.055.

== Naming ==
This minor planet was named after deep-sky astronomer George Robert Kepple, creator of the "Astro Cards" observing aids and co-author of The Night Sky Observer's Guide, popular among deep-sky observers. The official naming citation was published by the Minor Planet Center on 4 May 2004 (M.P.C. 51982).
