= List of minor planets: 61001–62000 =

The following is a partial list of minor planets, running from minor-planet number 61001 through 62000, inclusive. The primary data for this and other partial lists is based on JPL's "Small-Body Orbital Elements" and data available from the Minor Planet Center. Critical list information is also provided by the MPC, unless otherwise specified from Lowell Observatory. A detailed description of the table's columns and additional sources are given on the main page including a complete list of every page in this series, and a statistical break-up on the dynamical classification of minor planets.

Also see the summary list of all named bodies in numerical and alphabetical order, and the corresponding naming citations for the number range of this particular list. New namings may only be added to this list after official publication, as the preannouncement of names is condemned by the Working Group for Small Bodies Nomenclature of the International Astronomical Union.

Near-Earth obj.	MBA (inner)	MBA (outer)	Centaur
Mars-crosser	MBA (middle)	Jupiter trojan	Trans-Neptunian obj.
Unclassified

== 61001–61100 ==
Designation			Discovery			Properties		Ref
Permanent	Provisional	Named after	Date	Site	Discoverer(s)	Category	Diam.	Ref
61001	2000 KJ_{31}	—	May 28, 2000	Socorro	LINEAR	NYS	2.2 km	MPC · JPL
61002	2000 KS_{32}	—	May 28, 2000	Socorro	LINEAR	·	2.2 km	MPC · JPL
61003	2000 KU_{32}	—	May 28, 2000	Socorro	LINEAR	·	1.5 km	MPC · JPL
61004	2000 KH_{33}	—	May 28, 2000	Socorro	LINEAR	·	2.0 km	MPC · JPL
61005	2000 KA_{35}	—	May 27, 2000	Socorro	LINEAR	·	2.8 km	MPC · JPL
61006	2000 KR_{35}	—	May 27, 2000	Socorro	LINEAR	·	1.4 km	MPC · JPL
61007	2000 KV_{35}	—	May 27, 2000	Socorro	LINEAR	·	1.7 km	MPC · JPL
61008	2000 KE_{36}	—	May 27, 2000	Socorro	LINEAR	V	1.7 km	MPC · JPL
61009	2000 KH_{36}	—	May 27, 2000	Socorro	LINEAR	·	1.8 km	MPC · JPL
61010	2000 KR_{36}	—	May 28, 2000	Socorro	LINEAR	·	3.2 km	MPC · JPL
61011	2000 KJ_{40}	—	May 26, 2000	Kitt Peak	Spacewatch	·	1.9 km	MPC · JPL
61012	2000 KP_{41}	—	May 27, 2000	Socorro	LINEAR	·	3.2 km	MPC · JPL
61013	2000 KR_{41}	—	May 27, 2000	Socorro	LINEAR	·	4.0 km	MPC · JPL
61014	2000 KV_{41}	—	May 27, 2000	Socorro	LINEAR	NYS	2.3 km	MPC · JPL
61015	2000 KJ_{42}	—	May 28, 2000	Socorro	LINEAR	·	3.5 km	MPC · JPL
61016	2000 KT_{42}	—	May 25, 2000	Kitt Peak	Spacewatch	·	1.3 km	MPC · JPL
61017	2000 KX_{42}	—	May 25, 2000	Kitt Peak	Spacewatch	·	2.5 km	MPC · JPL
61018	2000 KA_{46}	—	May 30, 2000	Kitt Peak	Spacewatch	·	2.9 km	MPC · JPL
61019	2000 KU_{46}	—	May 27, 2000	Socorro	LINEAR	·	3.7 km	MPC · JPL
61020	2000 KC_{47}	—	May 27, 2000	Socorro	LINEAR	fast	6.3 km	MPC · JPL
61021	2000 KS_{49}	—	May 30, 2000	Kitt Peak	Spacewatch	·	2.0 km	MPC · JPL
61022	2000 KY_{49}	—	May 30, 2000	Kitt Peak	Spacewatch	V	1.7 km	MPC · JPL
61023	2000 KV_{50}	—	May 28, 2000	Socorro	LINEAR	·	2.9 km	MPC · JPL
61024	2000 KJ_{52}	—	May 23, 2000	Anderson Mesa	LONEOS	EOS	6.2 km	MPC · JPL
61025	2000 KU_{52}	—	May 25, 2000	Anderson Mesa	LONEOS	·	5.0 km	MPC · JPL
61026	2000 KG_{53}	—	May 28, 2000	Socorro	LINEAR	·	2.1 km	MPC · JPL
61027	2000 KP_{53}	—	May 29, 2000	Socorro	LINEAR	·	2.7 km	MPC · JPL
61028	2000 KR_{53}	—	May 29, 2000	Socorro	LINEAR	·	3.3 km	MPC · JPL
61029	2000 KG_{55}	—	May 27, 2000	Socorro	LINEAR	·	3.2 km	MPC · JPL
61030	2000 KN_{55}	—	May 27, 2000	Socorro	LINEAR	·	1.6 km	MPC · JPL
61031	2000 KQ_{55}	—	May 27, 2000	Socorro	LINEAR	·	1.7 km	MPC · JPL
61032	2000 KC_{56}	—	May 27, 2000	Socorro	LINEAR	·	2.3 km	MPC · JPL
61033	2000 KG_{56}	—	May 27, 2000	Socorro	LINEAR	·	1.6 km	MPC · JPL
61034	2000 KX_{56}	—	May 27, 2000	Socorro	LINEAR	·	6.4 km	MPC · JPL
61035	2000 KN_{57}	—	May 24, 2000	Kitt Peak	Spacewatch	·	4.9 km	MPC · JPL
61036	2000 KC_{59}	—	May 24, 2000	Kitt Peak	Spacewatch	·	2.6 km	MPC · JPL
61037	2000 KG_{59}	—	May 24, 2000	Kitt Peak	Spacewatch	·	3.5 km	MPC · JPL
61038	2000 KU_{59}	—	May 25, 2000	Anderson Mesa	LONEOS	·	3.6 km	MPC · JPL
61039	2000 KW_{59}	—	May 25, 2000	Anderson Mesa	LONEOS	THM	7.7 km	MPC · JPL
61040	2000 KQ_{60}	—	May 25, 2000	Anderson Mesa	LONEOS	·	6.6 km	MPC · JPL
61041	2000 KR_{60}	—	May 25, 2000	Anderson Mesa	LONEOS	(5)	2.4 km	MPC · JPL
61042 Noviello	2000 KB_{61}	Noviello	May 25, 2000	Anderson Mesa	LONEOS	T_{j} (2.97) · HIL · 3:2	16 km	MPC · JPL
61043	2000 KJ_{61}	—	May 25, 2000	Anderson Mesa	LONEOS	·	3.9 km	MPC · JPL
61044	2000 KT_{62}	—	May 26, 2000	Anderson Mesa	LONEOS	·	3.8 km	MPC · JPL
61045	2000 KU_{62}	—	May 26, 2000	Anderson Mesa	LONEOS	·	2.0 km	MPC · JPL
61046	2000 KB_{63}	—	May 26, 2000	Anderson Mesa	LONEOS	·	3.4 km	MPC · JPL
61047	2000 KJ_{63}	—	May 26, 2000	Anderson Mesa	LONEOS	·	1.4 km	MPC · JPL
61048	2000 KV_{63}	—	May 26, 2000	Anderson Mesa	LONEOS	·	8.3 km	MPC · JPL
61049	2000 KF_{65}	—	May 27, 2000	Socorro	LINEAR	·	3.0 km	MPC · JPL
61050	2000 KM_{72}	—	May 28, 2000	Socorro	LINEAR	·	2.2 km	MPC · JPL
61051	2000 KC_{73}	—	May 28, 2000	Anderson Mesa	LONEOS	·	2.1 km	MPC · JPL
61052	2000 KF_{73}	—	May 28, 2000	Anderson Mesa	LONEOS	·	3.4 km	MPC · JPL
61053	2000 KQ_{73}	—	May 27, 2000	Socorro	LINEAR	·	8.7 km	MPC · JPL
61054	2000 KR_{74}	—	May 27, 2000	Socorro	LINEAR	·	4.1 km	MPC · JPL
61055	2000 KJ_{75}	—	May 27, 2000	Socorro	LINEAR	·	4.1 km	MPC · JPL
61056	2000 KN_{75}	—	May 27, 2000	Socorro	LINEAR	·	3.4 km	MPC · JPL
61057	2000 KD_{76}	—	May 27, 2000	Anderson Mesa	LONEOS	·	3.8 km	MPC · JPL
61058	2000 KT_{78}	—	May 27, 2000	Socorro	LINEAR	·	2.4 km	MPC · JPL
61059	2000 LX	—	June 2, 2000	Kitt Peak	Spacewatch	·	2.6 km	MPC · JPL
61060	2000 LH_{1}	—	June 2, 2000	Črni Vrh	Matičič, S.	·	1.9 km	MPC · JPL
61061	2000 LX_{1}	—	June 4, 2000	Socorro	LINEAR	PHO	2.7 km	MPC · JPL
61062	2000 LF_{2}	—	June 3, 2000	Prescott	P. G. Comba	·	2.2 km	MPC · JPL
61063	2000 LN_{4}	—	June 4, 2000	Socorro	LINEAR	·	5.7 km	MPC · JPL
61064	2000 LW_{4}	—	June 5, 2000	Socorro	LINEAR	(883)	3.8 km	MPC · JPL
61065	2000 LE_{5}	—	June 5, 2000	Socorro	LINEAR	·	1.7 km	MPC · JPL
61066	2000 LV_{5}	—	June 4, 2000	Reedy Creek	J. Broughton	NYS	2.5 km	MPC · JPL
61067	2000 LQ_{6}	—	June 6, 2000	Prescott	P. G. Comba	·	2.2 km	MPC · JPL
61068	2000 LR_{6}	—	June 6, 2000	Prescott	P. G. Comba	·	1.9 km	MPC · JPL
61069	2000 LS_{7}	—	June 5, 2000	Socorro	LINEAR	·	2.1 km	MPC · JPL
61070	2000 LV_{7}	—	June 5, 2000	Socorro	LINEAR	·	6.1 km	MPC · JPL
61071	2000 LS_{8}	—	June 5, 2000	Socorro	LINEAR	·	1.8 km	MPC · JPL
61072	2000 LW_{8}	—	June 5, 2000	Socorro	LINEAR	(2076)	2.6 km	MPC · JPL
61073	2000 LB_{9}	—	June 5, 2000	Socorro	LINEAR	·	3.5 km	MPC · JPL
61074	2000 LR_{9}	—	June 5, 2000	Socorro	LINEAR	·	3.9 km	MPC · JPL
61075	2000 LQ_{10}	—	June 1, 2000	Socorro	LINEAR	·	4.1 km	MPC · JPL
61076	2000 LP_{14}	—	June 7, 2000	Socorro	LINEAR	EUN	4.0 km	MPC · JPL
61077	2000 LU_{15}	—	June 7, 2000	Kitt Peak	Spacewatch	·	1.7 km	MPC · JPL
61078	2000 LZ_{15}	—	June 6, 2000	Anderson Mesa	LONEOS	·	2.2 km	MPC · JPL
61079	2000 LY_{17}	—	June 8, 2000	Socorro	LINEAR	·	3.2 km	MPC · JPL
61080	2000 LW_{19}	—	June 8, 2000	Socorro	LINEAR	·	3.6 km	MPC · JPL
61081	2000 LZ_{19}	—	June 8, 2000	Socorro	LINEAR	·	2.4 km	MPC · JPL
61082	2000 LB_{20}	—	June 8, 2000	Socorro	LINEAR	·	4.2 km	MPC · JPL
61083	2000 LE_{20}	—	June 8, 2000	Socorro	LINEAR	·	3.6 km	MPC · JPL
61084	2000 LF_{20}	—	June 8, 2000	Socorro	LINEAR	·	5.2 km	MPC · JPL
61085	2000 LL_{21}	—	June 8, 2000	Socorro	LINEAR	·	2.2 km	MPC · JPL
61086	2000 LU_{21}	—	June 8, 2000	Socorro	LINEAR	·	1.6 km	MPC · JPL
61087	2000 LY_{21}	—	June 8, 2000	Socorro	LINEAR	EUN	5.1 km	MPC · JPL
61088	2000 LZ_{21}	—	June 8, 2000	Socorro	LINEAR	·	5.6 km	MPC · JPL
61089	2000 LO_{22}	—	June 6, 2000	Kitt Peak	Spacewatch	EOS	4.1 km	MPC · JPL
61090	2000 LN_{23}	—	June 1, 2000	Socorro	LINEAR	PHO	3.5 km	MPC · JPL
61091	2000 LU_{27}	—	June 6, 2000	Anderson Mesa	LONEOS	NYS	3.9 km	MPC · JPL
61092	2000 LV_{27}	—	June 6, 2000	Anderson Mesa	LONEOS	NYS ·	6.3 km	MPC · JPL
61093	2000 LW_{27}	—	June 6, 2000	Anderson Mesa	LONEOS	·	2.7 km	MPC · JPL
61094	2000 LH_{28}	—	June 6, 2000	Anderson Mesa	LONEOS	DOR	8.7 km	MPC · JPL
61095	2000 LP_{28}	—	June 9, 2000	Anderson Mesa	LONEOS	·	1.9 km	MPC · JPL
61096	2000 LS_{28}	—	June 9, 2000	Anderson Mesa	LONEOS	NYS ·	5.7 km	MPC · JPL
61097	2000 LT_{28}	—	June 12, 2000	Socorro	LINEAR	H	1.7 km	MPC · JPL
61098	2000 LY_{28}	—	June 6, 2000	Anderson Mesa	LONEOS	·	2.5 km	MPC · JPL
61099	2000 LG_{29}	—	June 11, 2000	Anderson Mesa	LONEOS	·	3.4 km	MPC · JPL
61100	2000 LJ_{29}	—	June 11, 2000	Anderson Mesa	LONEOS	·	3.0 km	MPC · JPL

== 61101–61200 ==
back to top

Designation			Discovery			Properties		Ref
Permanent	Provisional	Named after	Date	Site	Discoverer(s)	Category	Diam.	Ref
61101	2000 LD_{30}	—	June 7, 2000	Socorro	LINEAR	·	1.4 km	MPC · JPL
61102	2000 LM_{30}	—	June 7, 2000	Anderson Mesa	LONEOS	CYB	11 km	MPC · JPL
61103	2000 LP_{30}	—	June 9, 2000	Haleakala	NEAT	·	6.4 km	MPC · JPL
61104	2000 LU_{30}	—	June 10, 2000	Socorro	LINEAR	V	1.8 km	MPC · JPL
61105	2000 LN_{31}	—	June 5, 2000	Anderson Mesa	LONEOS	·	2.1 km	MPC · JPL
61106	2000 LQ_{31}	—	June 5, 2000	Anderson Mesa	LONEOS	·	3.8 km	MPC · JPL
61107	2000 LR_{31}	—	June 5, 2000	Anderson Mesa	LONEOS	·	1.7 km	MPC · JPL
61108	2000 LT_{31}	—	June 5, 2000	Anderson Mesa	LONEOS	(5)	3.0 km	MPC · JPL
61109	2000 LU_{31}	—	June 5, 2000	Anderson Mesa	LONEOS	·	3.1 km	MPC · JPL
61110	2000 LC_{32}	—	June 5, 2000	Anderson Mesa	LONEOS	·	1.7 km	MPC · JPL
61111	2000 LD_{33}	—	June 4, 2000	Kitt Peak	Spacewatch	·	2.3 km	MPC · JPL
61112	2000 LO_{33}	—	June 4, 2000	Haleakala	NEAT	·	2.0 km	MPC · JPL
61113	2000 LP_{33}	—	June 4, 2000	Haleakala	NEAT	PHO	2.3 km	MPC · JPL
61114	2000 LJ_{34}	—	June 3, 2000	Anderson Mesa	LONEOS	·	3.2 km	MPC · JPL
61115	2000 LQ_{34}	—	June 3, 2000	Anderson Mesa	LONEOS	·	6.3 km	MPC · JPL
61116	2000 LT_{34}	—	June 3, 2000	Kitt Peak	Spacewatch	·	1.9 km	MPC · JPL
61117	2000 LX_{34}	—	June 1, 2000	Haleakala	NEAT	·	2.5 km	MPC · JPL
61118	2000 LV_{35}	—	June 1, 2000	Anderson Mesa	LONEOS	·	2.7 km	MPC · JPL
61119	2000 LJ_{36}	—	June 1, 2000	Haleakala	NEAT	·	2.9 km	MPC · JPL
61120	2000 LL_{36}	—	June 1, 2000	Haleakala	NEAT	·	3.7 km	MPC · JPL
61121	2000 MU	—	June 23, 2000	Reedy Creek	J. Broughton	NYS	2.6 km	MPC · JPL
61122	2000 MM_{1}	—	June 25, 2000	Socorro	LINEAR	·	2.1 km	MPC · JPL
61123	2000 MN_{1}	—	June 25, 2000	Socorro	LINEAR	·	3.3 km	MPC · JPL
61124	2000 MX_{1}	—	June 27, 2000	Reedy Creek	J. Broughton	NYS	1.8 km	MPC · JPL
61125	2000 MK_{2}	—	June 24, 2000	Haleakala	NEAT	NYS	2.7 km	MPC · JPL
61126	2000 MN_{4}	—	June 25, 2000	Socorro	LINEAR	LEO	6.5 km	MPC · JPL
61127	2000 MH_{5}	—	June 26, 2000	Socorro	LINEAR	·	2.6 km	MPC · JPL
61128	2000 MB_{6}	—	June 24, 2000	Socorro	LINEAR	·	3.4 km	MPC · JPL
61129	2000 MD_{6}	—	June 24, 2000	Socorro	LINEAR	NYS	2.1 km	MPC · JPL
61130	2000 NK	—	July 2, 2000	Prescott	P. G. Comba	·	3.5 km	MPC · JPL
61131	2000 NN_{1}	—	July 3, 2000	Kitt Peak	Spacewatch	V	2.0 km	MPC · JPL
61132	2000 NC_{2}	—	July 5, 2000	Reedy Creek	J. Broughton	NYS ·	4.5 km	MPC · JPL
61133	2000 NL_{2}	—	July 5, 2000	Prescott	P. G. Comba	·	2.0 km	MPC · JPL
61134	2000 NP_{2}	—	July 3, 2000	Socorro	LINEAR	V	1.7 km	MPC · JPL
61135	2000 NT_{2}	—	July 5, 2000	Ondřejov	P. Kušnirák, P. Pravec	·	2.9 km	MPC · JPL
61136	2000 NC_{4}	—	July 3, 2000	Kitt Peak	Spacewatch	·	6.6 km	MPC · JPL
61137	2000 NR_{4}	—	July 3, 2000	Kitt Peak	Spacewatch	·	4.5 km	MPC · JPL
61138	2000 NX_{4}	—	July 7, 2000	Socorro	LINEAR	·	1.8 km	MPC · JPL
61139	2000 NO_{5}	—	July 7, 2000	Socorro	LINEAR	·	2.3 km	MPC · JPL
61140	2000 NR_{5}	—	July 8, 2000	Socorro	LINEAR	·	3.8 km	MPC · JPL
61141	2000 NZ_{5}	—	July 8, 2000	Bisei SG Center	BATTeRS	EUN	3.6 km	MPC · JPL
61142	2000 NW_{6}	—	July 4, 2000	Kitt Peak	Spacewatch	·	2.3 km	MPC · JPL
61143	2000 ND_{7}	—	July 4, 2000	Kitt Peak	Spacewatch	·	7.3 km	MPC · JPL
61144	2000 NW_{8}	—	July 5, 2000	Goodricke-Pigott	R. A. Tucker	·	1.6 km	MPC · JPL
61145	2000 NX_{8}	—	July 7, 2000	Socorro	LINEAR	·	2.5 km	MPC · JPL
61146	2000 NO_{10}	—	July 10, 2000	Valinhos	P. R. Holvorcem	·	3.6 km	MPC · JPL
61147	2000 ND_{11}	—	July 10, 2000	Valinhos	P. R. Holvorcem	NYS	4.0 km	MPC · JPL
61148	2000 NL_{11}	—	July 10, 2000	Valinhos	Valinhos	·	3.5 km	MPC · JPL
61149	2000 NU_{11}	—	July 4, 2000	Anderson Mesa	LONEOS	·	3.4 km	MPC · JPL
61150	2000 NV_{11}	—	July 4, 2000	Anderson Mesa	LONEOS	·	2.4 km	MPC · JPL
61151	2000 NV_{12}	—	July 5, 2000	Anderson Mesa	LONEOS	·	1.6 km	MPC · JPL
61152	2000 NE_{13}	—	July 5, 2000	Anderson Mesa	LONEOS	·	3.0 km	MPC · JPL
61153	2000 NV_{13}	—	July 5, 2000	Anderson Mesa	LONEOS	(2076)	3.0 km	MPC · JPL
61154	2000 NW_{13}	—	July 5, 2000	Anderson Mesa	LONEOS	GEF	3.7 km	MPC · JPL
61155	2000 NH_{14}	—	July 5, 2000	Anderson Mesa	LONEOS	·	4.8 km	MPC · JPL
61156	2000 NJ_{14}	—	July 5, 2000	Anderson Mesa	LONEOS	·	7.4 km	MPC · JPL
61157	2000 NE_{15}	—	July 5, 2000	Anderson Mesa	LONEOS	ERI	4.6 km	MPC · JPL
61158	2000 NN_{15}	—	July 5, 2000	Anderson Mesa	LONEOS	·	2.8 km	MPC · JPL
61159	2000 NZ_{16}	—	July 5, 2000	Anderson Mesa	LONEOS	NYS ·	3.7 km	MPC · JPL
61160	2000 NH_{18}	—	July 5, 2000	Anderson Mesa	LONEOS	·	2.5 km	MPC · JPL
61161	2000 NP_{18}	—	July 5, 2000	Anderson Mesa	LONEOS	·	1.9 km	MPC · JPL
61162	2000 NV_{18}	—	July 5, 2000	Anderson Mesa	LONEOS	·	1.4 km	MPC · JPL
61163	2000 NY_{18}	—	July 5, 2000	Anderson Mesa	LONEOS	NYS	2.3 km	MPC · JPL
61164	2000 NM_{19}	—	July 5, 2000	Anderson Mesa	LONEOS	·	1.9 km	MPC · JPL
61165	2000 NR_{19}	—	July 5, 2000	Anderson Mesa	LONEOS	·	2.7 km	MPC · JPL
61166	2000 NU_{19}	—	July 5, 2000	Anderson Mesa	LONEOS	·	5.9 km	MPC · JPL
61167	2000 NJ_{20}	—	July 6, 2000	Kitt Peak	Spacewatch	·	5.5 km	MPC · JPL
61168	2000 NU_{20}	—	July 6, 2000	Kitt Peak	Spacewatch	·	1.8 km	MPC · JPL
61169	2000 NY_{20}	—	July 6, 2000	Kitt Peak	Spacewatch	·	3.5 km	MPC · JPL
61170	2000 NZ_{20}	—	July 6, 2000	Kitt Peak	Spacewatch	·	4.1 km	MPC · JPL
61171	2000 NA_{21}	—	July 6, 2000	Anderson Mesa	LONEOS	V	2.9 km	MPC · JPL
61172	2000 NE_{21}	—	July 7, 2000	Anderson Mesa	LONEOS	MAR	4.2 km	MPC · JPL
61173	2000 NB_{22}	—	July 7, 2000	Socorro	LINEAR	·	2.4 km	MPC · JPL
61174	2000 NN_{22}	—	July 7, 2000	Anderson Mesa	LONEOS	·	2.0 km	MPC · JPL
61175	2000 NO_{22}	—	July 7, 2000	Anderson Mesa	LONEOS	·	4.6 km	MPC · JPL
61176	2000 NZ_{22}	—	July 5, 2000	Kitt Peak	Spacewatch	·	1.8 km	MPC · JPL
61177	2000 NJ_{23}	—	July 5, 2000	Anderson Mesa	LONEOS	·	3.2 km	MPC · JPL
61178	2000 NT_{23}	—	July 5, 2000	Kitt Peak	Spacewatch	MAS	2.4 km	MPC · JPL
61179	2000 NL_{24}	—	July 4, 2000	Anderson Mesa	LONEOS	NYS	3.1 km	MPC · JPL
61180	2000 NQ_{24}	—	July 4, 2000	Anderson Mesa	LONEOS	V	2.1 km	MPC · JPL
61181	2000 NT_{24}	—	July 4, 2000	Anderson Mesa	LONEOS	NYS	1.9 km	MPC · JPL
61182	2000 NJ_{25}	—	July 4, 2000	Anderson Mesa	LONEOS	·	3.4 km	MPC · JPL
61183	2000 NB_{26}	—	July 4, 2000	Anderson Mesa	LONEOS	·	1.7 km	MPC · JPL
61184	2000 NO_{26}	—	July 4, 2000	Anderson Mesa	LONEOS	·	4.8 km	MPC · JPL
61185	2000 NS_{26}	—	July 4, 2000	Anderson Mesa	LONEOS	EOS	4.1 km	MPC · JPL
61186	2000 NA_{27}	—	July 4, 2000	Anderson Mesa	LONEOS	·	4.6 km	MPC · JPL
61187	2000 NM_{27}	—	July 4, 2000	Anderson Mesa	LONEOS	·	3.5 km	MPC · JPL
61188	2000 NT_{27}	—	July 4, 2000	Anderson Mesa	LONEOS	MAS	1.8 km	MPC · JPL
61189 Ohsadaharu	2000 NE_{29}	Ohsadaharu	July 8, 2000	Bisei SG Center	BATTeRS	·	3.5 km	MPC · JPL
61190 Johnschutt	2000 NF_{29}	Johnschutt	July 1, 2000	Anza	M. Collins, White, M.	·	2.3 km	MPC · JPL
61191	2000 OA	—	July 21, 2000	Prescott	P. G. Comba	·	1.7 km	MPC · JPL
61192	2000 OU	—	July 23, 2000	Farpoint	G. Hug	·	3.7 km	MPC · JPL
61193	2000 OQ_{1}	—	July 26, 2000	Prescott	P. G. Comba	·	2.0 km	MPC · JPL
61194	2000 OU_{1}	—	July 24, 2000	Farpoint	Farpoint	V	2.0 km	MPC · JPL
61195 Martinoli	2000 OU_{2}	Martinoli	July 28, 2000	Gnosca	S. Sposetti	·	3.2 km	MPC · JPL
61196	2000 OD_{3}	—	July 23, 2000	Socorro	LINEAR	·	3.7 km	MPC · JPL
61197	2000 OG_{3}	—	July 23, 2000	Socorro	LINEAR	·	10 km	MPC · JPL
61198	2000 ON_{3}	—	July 24, 2000	Socorro	LINEAR	·	1.7 km	MPC · JPL
61199	2000 OA_{4}	—	July 24, 2000	Socorro	LINEAR	·	1.7 km	MPC · JPL
61200	2000 OC_{4}	—	July 24, 2000	Socorro	LINEAR	·	2.3 km	MPC · JPL

== 61201–61300 ==
back to top

Designation			Discovery			Properties		Ref
Permanent	Provisional	Named after	Date	Site	Discoverer(s)	Category	Diam.	Ref
61201	2000 OK_{4}	—	July 24, 2000	Socorro	LINEAR	·	1.9 km	MPC · JPL
61202	2000 OM_{4}	—	July 24, 2000	Socorro	LINEAR	·	3.8 km	MPC · JPL
61203	2000 OY_{4}	—	July 24, 2000	Socorro	LINEAR	·	3.8 km	MPC · JPL
61204	2000 OP_{5}	—	July 24, 2000	Socorro	LINEAR	·	3.4 km	MPC · JPL
61205	2000 OL_{6}	—	July 29, 2000	Socorro	LINEAR	·	2.7 km	MPC · JPL
61206	2000 OS_{6}	—	July 29, 2000	Socorro	LINEAR	·	2.5 km	MPC · JPL
61207	2000 OZ_{7}	—	July 30, 2000	Socorro	LINEAR	(1547)	3.9 km	MPC · JPL
61208 Stonařov	2000 OD_{8}	Stonařov	July 30, 2000	Kleť	J. Tichá, M. Tichý	·	2.1 km	MPC · JPL
61209	2000 OM_{9}	—	July 30, 2000	Reedy Creek	J. Broughton	·	2.4 km	MPC · JPL
61210	2000 OU_{9}	—	July 23, 2000	Socorro	LINEAR	·	1.9 km	MPC · JPL
61211	2000 OH_{10}	—	July 23, 2000	Socorro	LINEAR	·	3.5 km	MPC · JPL
61212	2000 OJ_{10}	—	July 23, 2000	Socorro	LINEAR	·	2.2 km	MPC · JPL
61213	2000 OK_{10}	—	July 23, 2000	Socorro	LINEAR	·	1.3 km	MPC · JPL
61214	2000 OQ_{10}	—	July 23, 2000	Socorro	LINEAR	MAS	3.0 km	MPC · JPL
61215	2000 OX_{10}	—	July 23, 2000	Socorro	LINEAR	·	4.5 km	MPC · JPL
61216	2000 OA_{11}	—	July 23, 2000	Socorro	LINEAR	·	1.6 km	MPC · JPL
61217	2000 OF_{11}	—	July 23, 2000	Socorro	LINEAR	·	2.1 km	MPC · JPL
61218	2000 OH_{11}	—	July 23, 2000	Socorro	LINEAR	·	3.6 km	MPC · JPL
61219	2000 ON_{12}	—	July 23, 2000	Socorro	LINEAR	·	1.2 km	MPC · JPL
61220	2000 OO_{12}	—	July 23, 2000	Socorro	LINEAR	·	1.2 km	MPC · JPL
61221	2000 OZ_{12}	—	July 23, 2000	Socorro	LINEAR	·	3.0 km	MPC · JPL
61222	2000 OC_{13}	—	July 23, 2000	Socorro	LINEAR	·	3.2 km	MPC · JPL
61223	2000 OL_{13}	—	July 23, 2000	Socorro	LINEAR	·	2.7 km	MPC · JPL
61224	2000 OO_{13}	—	July 23, 2000	Socorro	LINEAR	·	4.0 km	MPC · JPL
61225	2000 OP_{13}	—	July 23, 2000	Socorro	LINEAR	·	5.5 km	MPC · JPL
61226	2000 OR_{13}	—	July 23, 2000	Socorro	LINEAR	HNS	5.5 km	MPC · JPL
61227	2000 OS_{13}	—	July 23, 2000	Socorro	LINEAR	·	2.2 km	MPC · JPL
61228	2000 OX_{13}	—	July 23, 2000	Socorro	LINEAR	·	2.2 km	MPC · JPL
61229	2000 OA_{14}	—	July 23, 2000	Socorro	LINEAR	·	2.3 km	MPC · JPL
61230	2000 OG_{14}	—	July 23, 2000	Socorro	LINEAR	·	1.5 km	MPC · JPL
61231	2000 OA_{15}	—	July 23, 2000	Socorro	LINEAR	·	2.6 km	MPC · JPL
61232	2000 OB_{15}	—	July 23, 2000	Socorro	LINEAR	·	1.7 km	MPC · JPL
61233	2000 ON_{15}	—	July 23, 2000	Socorro	LINEAR	·	2.7 km	MPC · JPL
61234	2000 OR_{15}	—	July 23, 2000	Socorro	LINEAR	·	4.8 km	MPC · JPL
61235	2000 OT_{15}	—	July 23, 2000	Socorro	LINEAR	·	2.8 km	MPC · JPL
61236	2000 ON_{16}	—	July 23, 2000	Socorro	LINEAR	NYS	4.4 km	MPC · JPL
61237	2000 OP_{16}	—	July 23, 2000	Socorro	LINEAR	MAS	1.8 km	MPC · JPL
61238	2000 OF_{17}	—	July 23, 2000	Socorro	LINEAR	·	1.9 km	MPC · JPL
61239	2000 OP_{17}	—	July 23, 2000	Socorro	LINEAR	·	1.8 km	MPC · JPL
61240	2000 OT_{17}	—	July 23, 2000	Socorro	LINEAR	NYS	3.3 km	MPC · JPL
61241	2000 OW_{17}	—	July 23, 2000	Socorro	LINEAR	·	2.0 km	MPC · JPL
61242	2000 OX_{17}	—	July 23, 2000	Socorro	LINEAR	·	3.0 km	MPC · JPL
61243	2000 OJ_{18}	—	July 23, 2000	Socorro	LINEAR	PAD	5.2 km	MPC · JPL
61244	2000 OM_{19}	—	July 30, 2000	Socorro	LINEAR	V	1.8 km	MPC · JPL
61245	2000 ON_{22}	—	July 31, 2000	Socorro	LINEAR	·	2.1 km	MPC · JPL
61246	2000 OX_{22}	—	July 23, 2000	Socorro	LINEAR	·	1.6 km	MPC · JPL
61247	2000 OF_{23}	—	July 23, 2000	Socorro	LINEAR	·	3.6 km	MPC · JPL
61248	2000 OH_{23}	—	July 23, 2000	Socorro	LINEAR	·	2.9 km	MPC · JPL
61249	2000 OO_{23}	—	July 23, 2000	Socorro	LINEAR	·	2.8 km	MPC · JPL
61250	2000 OV_{23}	—	July 23, 2000	Socorro	LINEAR	·	4.0 km	MPC · JPL
61251	2000 OE_{24}	—	July 23, 2000	Socorro	LINEAR	·	2.3 km	MPC · JPL
61252	2000 OK_{24}	—	July 23, 2000	Socorro	LINEAR	·	3.1 km	MPC · JPL
61253	2000 OM_{24}	—	July 23, 2000	Socorro	LINEAR	V	3.3 km	MPC · JPL
61254	2000 OC_{25}	—	July 23, 2000	Socorro	LINEAR	V	2.0 km	MPC · JPL
61255	2000 OJ_{25}	—	July 23, 2000	Socorro	LINEAR	·	2.1 km	MPC · JPL
61256	2000 OT_{25}	—	July 23, 2000	Socorro	LINEAR	·	1.8 km	MPC · JPL
61257	2000 OY_{25}	—	July 23, 2000	Socorro	LINEAR	MAS	1.4 km	MPC · JPL
61258	2000 OD_{26}	—	July 23, 2000	Socorro	LINEAR	·	1.5 km	MPC · JPL
61259	2000 OG_{26}	—	July 23, 2000	Socorro	LINEAR	·	3.0 km	MPC · JPL
61260	2000 OF_{27}	—	July 23, 2000	Socorro	LINEAR	NYS	2.1 km	MPC · JPL
61261	2000 OO_{27}	—	July 23, 2000	Socorro	LINEAR	·	4.5 km	MPC · JPL
61262	2000 OJ_{28}	—	July 29, 2000	Socorro	LINEAR	(2076)	2.1 km	MPC · JPL
61263	2000 OR_{28}	—	July 30, 2000	Socorro	LINEAR	·	3.2 km	MPC · JPL
61264	2000 OH_{29}	—	July 30, 2000	Socorro	LINEAR	·	5.1 km	MPC · JPL
61265	2000 ON_{29}	—	July 30, 2000	Socorro	LINEAR	·	2.6 km	MPC · JPL
61266	2000 OY_{29}	—	July 30, 2000	Socorro	LINEAR	EUN	3.9 km	MPC · JPL
61267	2000 OC_{30}	—	July 30, 2000	Socorro	LINEAR	·	3.2 km	MPC · JPL
61268	2000 OG_{30}	—	July 30, 2000	Socorro	LINEAR	·	8.2 km	MPC · JPL
61269	2000 OK_{30}	—	July 30, 2000	Socorro	LINEAR	·	3.6 km	MPC · JPL
61270	2000 OC_{31}	—	July 30, 2000	Socorro	LINEAR	·	1.7 km	MPC · JPL
61271	2000 OE_{31}	—	July 30, 2000	Socorro	LINEAR	·	2.8 km	MPC · JPL
61272	2000 OR_{31}	—	July 30, 2000	Socorro	LINEAR	V	1.6 km	MPC · JPL
61273	2000 OL_{32}	—	July 30, 2000	Socorro	LINEAR	·	1.8 km	MPC · JPL
61274	2000 OE_{33}	—	July 30, 2000	Socorro	LINEAR	·	1.3 km	MPC · JPL
61275	2000 OE_{34}	—	July 30, 2000	Socorro	LINEAR	(5)	4.5 km	MPC · JPL
61276	2000 OH_{34}	—	July 30, 2000	Socorro	LINEAR	·	3.2 km	MPC · JPL
61277	2000 OS_{34}	—	July 30, 2000	Socorro	LINEAR	·	2.6 km	MPC · JPL
61278	2000 OU_{34}	—	July 30, 2000	Socorro	LINEAR	·	2.2 km	MPC · JPL
61279	2000 OF_{35}	—	July 30, 2000	Socorro	LINEAR	·	1.6 km	MPC · JPL
61280	2000 OH_{35}	—	July 30, 2000	Socorro	LINEAR	·	2.0 km	MPC · JPL
61281	2000 OK_{35}	—	July 30, 2000	Socorro	LINEAR	·	1.4 km	MPC · JPL
61282	2000 OE_{36}	—	July 24, 2000	Socorro	LINEAR	V	1.9 km	MPC · JPL
61283	2000 OX_{37}	—	July 30, 2000	Socorro	LINEAR	·	6.0 km	MPC · JPL
61284	2000 OF_{39}	—	July 30, 2000	Socorro	LINEAR	MAR	2.3 km	MPC · JPL
61285	2000 OL_{39}	—	July 30, 2000	Socorro	LINEAR	·	4.8 km	MPC · JPL
61286	2000 OL_{41}	—	July 30, 2000	Socorro	LINEAR	·	1.8 km	MPC · JPL
61287	2000 OR_{41}	—	July 30, 2000	Socorro	LINEAR	·	3.2 km	MPC · JPL
61288	2000 OE_{42}	—	July 30, 2000	Socorro	LINEAR	·	4.0 km	MPC · JPL
61289	2000 OU_{42}	—	July 30, 2000	Socorro	LINEAR	·	1.6 km	MPC · JPL
61290	2000 OX_{42}	—	July 30, 2000	Socorro	LINEAR	GEF	4.6 km	MPC · JPL
61291	2000 OA_{43}	—	July 30, 2000	Socorro	LINEAR	·	4.2 km	MPC · JPL
61292	2000 OL_{43}	—	July 30, 2000	Socorro	LINEAR	·	3.5 km	MPC · JPL
61293	2000 OZ_{43}	—	July 30, 2000	Socorro	LINEAR	·	3.2 km	MPC · JPL
61294	2000 OK_{44}	—	July 30, 2000	Socorro	LINEAR	V	1.6 km	MPC · JPL
61295	2000 OX_{44}	—	July 30, 2000	Socorro	LINEAR	PHO	2.7 km	MPC · JPL
61296	2000 ON_{45}	—	July 30, 2000	Socorro	LINEAR	·	1.7 km	MPC · JPL
61297	2000 OD_{46}	—	July 30, 2000	Socorro	LINEAR	·	1.6 km	MPC · JPL
61298	2000 OG_{46}	—	July 31, 2000	Socorro	LINEAR	·	5.4 km	MPC · JPL
61299	2000 OQ_{46}	—	July 31, 2000	Socorro	LINEAR	·	2.5 km	MPC · JPL
61300	2000 OJ_{47}	—	July 31, 2000	Socorro	LINEAR	NYS	3.6 km	MPC · JPL

== 61301–61400 ==
back to top

Designation			Discovery			Properties		Ref
Permanent	Provisional	Named after	Date	Site	Discoverer(s)	Category	Diam.	Ref
61301	2000 ON_{47}	—	July 31, 2000	Socorro	LINEAR	EUN	3.3 km	MPC · JPL
61302	2000 OS_{47}	—	July 31, 2000	Socorro	LINEAR	·	2.3 km	MPC · JPL
61303	2000 OY_{47}	—	July 31, 2000	Socorro	LINEAR	·	3.6 km	MPC · JPL
61304	2000 OJ_{48}	—	July 31, 2000	Socorro	LINEAR	NYS	3.2 km	MPC · JPL
61305	2000 OV_{48}	—	July 31, 2000	Socorro	LINEAR	·	4.8 km	MPC · JPL
61306	2000 OF_{49}	—	July 31, 2000	Socorro	LINEAR	·	2.1 km	MPC · JPL
61307	2000 OJ_{49}	—	July 31, 2000	Socorro	LINEAR	MAR	4.0 km	MPC · JPL
61308	2000 ON_{49}	—	July 31, 2000	Socorro	LINEAR	·	3.3 km	MPC · JPL
61309	2000 OF_{50}	—	July 31, 2000	Socorro	LINEAR	PHO	6.8 km	MPC · JPL
61310	2000 OQ_{50}	—	July 31, 2000	Socorro	LINEAR	·	2.0 km	MPC · JPL
61311	2000 OR_{50}	—	July 31, 2000	Socorro	LINEAR	NYS	3.1 km	MPC · JPL
61312	2000 OS_{50}	—	July 31, 2000	Socorro	LINEAR	NYS	3.0 km	MPC · JPL
61313	2000 OF_{51}	—	July 30, 2000	Socorro	LINEAR	·	3.4 km	MPC · JPL
61314	2000 OH_{51}	—	July 30, 2000	Socorro	LINEAR	PHO	2.9 km	MPC · JPL
61315	2000 OM_{51}	—	July 30, 2000	Socorro	LINEAR	·	4.7 km	MPC · JPL
61316	2000 ON_{51}	—	July 30, 2000	Socorro	LINEAR	·	5.5 km	MPC · JPL
61317	2000 OO_{51}	—	July 30, 2000	Socorro	LINEAR	·	6.0 km	MPC · JPL
61318	2000 OV_{51}	—	July 30, 2000	Socorro	LINEAR	·	4.5 km	MPC · JPL
61319	2000 OW_{51}	—	July 30, 2000	Socorro	LINEAR	EUN	3.9 km	MPC · JPL
61320	2000 OZ_{51}	—	July 31, 2000	Socorro	LINEAR	·	2.5 km	MPC · JPL
61321	2000 OO_{54}	—	July 29, 2000	Anderson Mesa	LONEOS	(2076)	2.4 km	MPC · JPL
61322	2000 OT_{54}	—	July 29, 2000	Anderson Mesa	LONEOS	MAS	1.4 km	MPC · JPL
61323	2000 OZ_{54}	—	July 29, 2000	Anderson Mesa	LONEOS	·	2.4 km	MPC · JPL
61324	2000 OO_{56}	—	July 29, 2000	Anderson Mesa	LONEOS	·	1.5 km	MPC · JPL
61325	2000 OV_{56}	—	July 29, 2000	Anderson Mesa	LONEOS	·	5.0 km	MPC · JPL
61326	2000 OP_{57}	—	July 29, 2000	Anderson Mesa	LONEOS	·	1.6 km	MPC · JPL
61327	2000 OR_{57}	—	July 29, 2000	Anderson Mesa	LONEOS	·	3.8 km	MPC · JPL
61328	2000 OD_{58}	—	July 29, 2000	Anderson Mesa	LONEOS	·	7.1 km	MPC · JPL
61329	2000 OG_{58}	—	July 29, 2000	Anderson Mesa	LONEOS	EOS	3.9 km	MPC · JPL
61330	2000 OT_{58}	—	July 29, 2000	Anderson Mesa	LONEOS	NYS	2.7 km	MPC · JPL
61331	2000 OH_{59}	—	July 29, 2000	Anderson Mesa	LONEOS	·	2.4 km	MPC · JPL
61332	2000 OL_{59}	—	July 29, 2000	Anderson Mesa	LONEOS	·	1.7 km	MPC · JPL
61333	2000 OP_{59}	—	July 29, 2000	Anderson Mesa	LONEOS	·	3.1 km	MPC · JPL
61334	2000 OS_{59}	—	July 29, 2000	Anderson Mesa	LONEOS	·	2.0 km	MPC · JPL
61335	2000 OT_{59}	—	July 29, 2000	Anderson Mesa	LONEOS	·	2.4 km	MPC · JPL
61336	2000 OT_{67}	—	July 23, 2000	Socorro	LINEAR	fast	2.6 km	MPC · JPL
61337	2000 OE_{68}	—	July 29, 2000	Cerro Tololo	M. W. Buie	·	2.6 km	MPC · JPL
61338	2000 PK	—	August 1, 2000	Bergisch Gladbach	W. Bickel	EOS	4.9 km	MPC · JPL
61339	2000 PA_{1}	—	August 1, 2000	Socorro	LINEAR	·	6.4 km	MPC · JPL
61340	2000 PY_{2}	—	August 2, 2000	Socorro	LINEAR	·	4.6 km	MPC · JPL
61341	2000 PC_{3}	—	August 1, 2000	Reedy Creek	J. Broughton	·	2.5 km	MPC · JPL
61342 Lovejoy	2000 PJ_{3}	Lovejoy	August 3, 2000	Loomberah	G. J. Garradd	·	2.8 km	MPC · JPL
61343	2000 PC_{5}	—	August 2, 2000	Socorro	LINEAR	·	2.2 km	MPC · JPL
61344 Jicakyoryokutai	2000 PT_{5}	Jicakyoryokutai	August 3, 2000	Bisei SG Center	BATTeRS	·	1.5 km	MPC · JPL
61345	2000 PU_{5}	—	August 3, 2000	Bergisch Gladbach	W. Bickel	NYS	3.1 km	MPC · JPL
61346	2000 PD_{8}	—	August 3, 2000	Socorro	LINEAR	·	2.9 km	MPC · JPL
61347	2000 PE_{8}	—	August 3, 2000	Socorro	LINEAR	·	3.2 km	MPC · JPL
61348	2000 PF_{8}	—	August 4, 2000	Socorro	LINEAR	MAR	3.9 km	MPC · JPL
61349	2000 PD_{9}	—	August 6, 2000	Siding Spring	R. H. McNaught	·	3.1 km	MPC · JPL
61350	2000 PL_{9}	—	August 6, 2000	Siding Spring	R. H. McNaught	·	4.0 km	MPC · JPL
61351	2000 PS_{9}	—	August 9, 2000	Ametlla de Mar	J. Nomen	MAS	2.0 km	MPC · JPL
61352	2000 PY_{9}	—	August 1, 2000	Socorro	LINEAR	·	3.1 km	MPC · JPL
61353	2000 PE_{10}	—	August 1, 2000	Socorro	LINEAR	·	3.4 km	MPC · JPL
61354	2000 PY_{10}	—	August 1, 2000	Socorro	LINEAR	·	3.2 km	MPC · JPL
61355	2000 PD_{11}	—	August 1, 2000	Socorro	LINEAR	EOS	4.8 km	MPC · JPL
61356	2000 PG_{11}	—	August 1, 2000	Socorro	LINEAR	EUN	2.7 km	MPC · JPL
61357	2000 PZ_{11}	—	August 1, 2000	Socorro	LINEAR	·	6.1 km	MPC · JPL
61358	2000 PK_{12}	—	August 2, 2000	Socorro	LINEAR	EUN	3.0 km	MPC · JPL
61359	2000 PW_{13}	—	August 1, 2000	Socorro	LINEAR	·	2.9 km	MPC · JPL
61360	2000 PB_{14}	—	August 1, 2000	Socorro	LINEAR	·	4.3 km	MPC · JPL
61361	2000 PB_{18}	—	August 1, 2000	Socorro	LINEAR	(5)	3.0 km	MPC · JPL
61362	2000 PO_{19}	—	August 1, 2000	Socorro	LINEAR	·	3.5 km	MPC · JPL
61363	2000 PT_{19}	—	August 1, 2000	Socorro	LINEAR	·	1.9 km	MPC · JPL
61364	2000 PH_{20}	—	August 1, 2000	Socorro	LINEAR	·	3.3 km	MPC · JPL
61365	2000 PW_{20}	—	August 1, 2000	Socorro	LINEAR	NYS	2.0 km	MPC · JPL
61366	2000 PE_{21}	—	August 1, 2000	Socorro	LINEAR	·	4.9 km	MPC · JPL
61367	2000 PG_{22}	—	August 1, 2000	Socorro	LINEAR	·	5.3 km	MPC · JPL
61368	2000 PH_{22}	—	August 1, 2000	Socorro	LINEAR	·	1.8 km	MPC · JPL
61369	2000 PO_{22}	—	August 1, 2000	Socorro	LINEAR	GEF	3.8 km	MPC · JPL
61370	2000 PU_{22}	—	August 2, 2000	Socorro	LINEAR	·	2.3 km	MPC · JPL
61371	2000 PO_{23}	—	August 2, 2000	Socorro	LINEAR	·	2.3 km	MPC · JPL
61372	2000 PQ_{23}	—	August 2, 2000	Socorro	LINEAR	NYS	2.3 km	MPC · JPL
61373	2000 PG_{24}	—	August 2, 2000	Socorro	LINEAR	V	1.5 km	MPC · JPL
61374	2000 PA_{25}	—	August 3, 2000	Socorro	LINEAR	·	2.5 km	MPC · JPL
61375	2000 PE_{25}	—	August 3, 2000	Socorro	LINEAR	(5)	3.5 km	MPC · JPL
61376	2000 PC_{28}	—	August 4, 2000	Haleakala	NEAT	·	3.5 km	MPC · JPL
61377	2000 PO_{28}	—	August 3, 2000	Socorro	LINEAR	·	1.7 km	MPC · JPL
61378	2000 PU_{28}	—	August 2, 2000	Socorro	LINEAR	MAS	2.1 km	MPC · JPL
61379	2000 PG_{29}	—	August 1, 2000	Socorro	LINEAR	RAF	2.7 km	MPC · JPL
61380	2000 PH_{29}	—	August 1, 2000	Socorro	LINEAR	·	2.9 km	MPC · JPL
61381	2000 PL_{29}	—	August 1, 2000	Socorro	LINEAR	·	4.2 km	MPC · JPL
61382	2000 PR_{29}	—	August 1, 2000	Socorro	LINEAR	·	2.3 km	MPC · JPL
61383	2000 QB	—	August 20, 2000	Prescott	P. G. Comba	MAS	1.5 km	MPC · JPL
61384 Arturoromer	2000 QW	Arturoromer	August 22, 2000	Gnosca	S. Sposetti	NYS	2.5 km	MPC · JPL
61385	2000 QG_{1}	—	August 23, 2000	Reedy Creek	J. Broughton	·	2.6 km	MPC · JPL
61386 Namikoshi	2000 QT_{1}	Namikoshi	August 24, 2000	Gnosca	S. Sposetti	NYS	3.0 km	MPC · JPL
61387	2000 QR_{2}	—	August 24, 2000	Socorro	LINEAR	·	4.0 km	MPC · JPL
61388	2000 QA_{3}	—	August 24, 2000	Socorro	LINEAR	·	4.2 km	MPC · JPL
61389	2000 QD_{3}	—	August 24, 2000	Socorro	LINEAR	V	1.5 km	MPC · JPL
61390	2000 QR_{3}	—	August 24, 2000	Socorro	LINEAR	·	1.7 km	MPC · JPL
61391	2000 QT_{3}	—	August 24, 2000	Socorro	LINEAR	·	2.2 km	MPC · JPL
61392	2000 QC_{4}	—	August 24, 2000	Socorro	LINEAR	·	2.2 km	MPC · JPL
61393	2000 QD_{4}	—	August 24, 2000	Socorro	LINEAR	·	4.4 km	MPC · JPL
61394	2000 QY_{4}	—	August 24, 2000	Socorro	LINEAR	·	2.1 km	MPC · JPL
61395	2000 QZ_{4}	—	August 24, 2000	Socorro	LINEAR	·	2.4 km	MPC · JPL
61396	2000 QD_{5}	—	August 24, 2000	Socorro	LINEAR	(13314)	4.1 km	MPC · JPL
61397	2000 QF_{5}	—	August 24, 2000	Socorro	LINEAR	NYS	3.9 km	MPC · JPL
61398	2000 QJ_{5}	—	August 24, 2000	Socorro	LINEAR	·	3.1 km	MPC · JPL
61399	2000 QZ_{5}	—	August 24, 2000	Socorro	LINEAR	·	2.2 km	MPC · JPL
61400 Voxandreae	2000 QM_{6}	Voxandreae	August 25, 2000	Emerald Lane	L. Ball	·	3.7 km	MPC · JPL

== 61401–61500 ==
back to top

Designation			Discovery			Properties		Ref
Permanent	Provisional	Named after	Date	Site	Discoverer(s)	Category	Diam.	Ref
61401 Schiff	2000 QQ_{6}	Schiff	August 25, 2000	Gnosca	S. Sposetti	(5)	3.2 km	MPC · JPL
61402 Franciseveritt	2000 QS_{6}	Franciseveritt	August 25, 2000	Gnosca	S. Sposetti	·	1.7 km	MPC · JPL
61403	2000 QG_{9}	—	August 25, 2000	Oakley	Wolfe, C., Bettelheim, E.	·	6.3 km	MPC · JPL
61404 Očenášek	2000 QM_{9}	Očenášek	August 26, 2000	Ondřejov	P. Pravec, P. Kušnirák	·	6.5 km	MPC · JPL
61405	2000 QT_{9}	—	August 24, 2000	Bergisch Gladbach	W. Bickel	·	3.2 km	MPC · JPL
61406	2000 QZ_{9}	—	August 24, 2000	Socorro	LINEAR	·	2.0 km	MPC · JPL
61407	2000 QK_{10}	—	August 24, 2000	Socorro	LINEAR	·	2.7 km	MPC · JPL
61408	2000 QR_{11}	—	August 24, 2000	Socorro	LINEAR	·	3.0 km	MPC · JPL
61409	2000 QW_{11}	—	August 24, 2000	Socorro	LINEAR	·	3.7 km	MPC · JPL
61410	2000 QX_{11}	—	August 24, 2000	Socorro	LINEAR	·	1.7 km	MPC · JPL
61411	2000 QC_{12}	—	August 24, 2000	Socorro	LINEAR	·	2.5 km	MPC · JPL
61412	2000 QF_{12}	—	August 24, 2000	Socorro	LINEAR	·	6.3 km	MPC · JPL
61413	2000 QG_{12}	—	August 24, 2000	Socorro	LINEAR	·	2.0 km	MPC · JPL
61414	2000 QH_{12}	—	August 24, 2000	Socorro	LINEAR	NYS	3.6 km	MPC · JPL
61415	2000 QK_{12}	—	August 24, 2000	Socorro	LINEAR	·	2.3 km	MPC · JPL
61416	2000 QL_{12}	—	August 24, 2000	Socorro	LINEAR	·	1.6 km	MPC · JPL
61417	2000 QP_{13}	—	August 24, 2000	Socorro	LINEAR	·	3.3 km	MPC · JPL
61418	2000 QR_{13}	—	August 24, 2000	Socorro	LINEAR	HYG	6.2 km	MPC · JPL
61419	2000 QM_{14}	—	August 24, 2000	Socorro	LINEAR	·	1.7 km	MPC · JPL
61420	2000 QN_{14}	—	August 24, 2000	Socorro	LINEAR	·	3.2 km	MPC · JPL
61421	2000 QU_{14}	—	August 24, 2000	Socorro	LINEAR	·	2.8 km	MPC · JPL
61422	2000 QN_{15}	—	August 24, 2000	Socorro	LINEAR	KOR	3.2 km	MPC · JPL
61423	2000 QS_{15}	—	August 24, 2000	Socorro	LINEAR	THM	6.3 km	MPC · JPL
61424	2000 QX_{15}	—	August 24, 2000	Socorro	LINEAR	·	1.3 km	MPC · JPL
61425	2000 QA_{16}	—	August 24, 2000	Socorro	LINEAR	·	3.2 km	MPC · JPL
61426	2000 QP_{16}	—	August 24, 2000	Socorro	LINEAR	·	2.9 km	MPC · JPL
61427	2000 QR_{16}	—	August 24, 2000	Socorro	LINEAR	·	2.6 km	MPC · JPL
61428	2000 QA_{17}	—	August 24, 2000	Socorro	LINEAR	·	1.4 km	MPC · JPL
61429	2000 QF_{17}	—	August 24, 2000	Socorro	LINEAR	·	2.2 km	MPC · JPL
61430	2000 QJ_{17}	—	August 24, 2000	Socorro	LINEAR	·	5.0 km	MPC · JPL
61431	2000 QY_{17}	—	August 24, 2000	Socorro	LINEAR	KOR	5.0 km	MPC · JPL
61432	2000 QS_{18}	—	August 24, 2000	Socorro	LINEAR	HOF	4.9 km	MPC · JPL
61433	2000 QY_{18}	—	August 24, 2000	Socorro	LINEAR	NYS	2.6 km	MPC · JPL
61434	2000 QB_{19}	—	August 24, 2000	Socorro	LINEAR	·	2.6 km	MPC · JPL
61435	2000 QC_{19}	—	August 24, 2000	Socorro	LINEAR	·	4.0 km	MPC · JPL
61436	2000 QD_{19}	—	August 24, 2000	Socorro	LINEAR	V	1.8 km	MPC · JPL
61437	2000 QQ_{19}	—	August 24, 2000	Socorro	LINEAR	·	4.7 km	MPC · JPL
61438	2000 QE_{20}	—	August 24, 2000	Socorro	LINEAR	HYG	6.8 km	MPC · JPL
61439	2000 QM_{22}	—	August 25, 2000	Socorro	LINEAR	·	2.2 km	MPC · JPL
61440	2000 QE_{23}	—	August 25, 2000	Socorro	LINEAR	EOS	3.4 km	MPC · JPL
61441	2000 QW_{23}	—	August 25, 2000	Socorro	LINEAR	·	4.0 km	MPC · JPL
61442	2000 QK_{24}	—	August 25, 2000	Socorro	LINEAR	·	2.7 km	MPC · JPL
61443	2000 QW_{24}	—	August 25, 2000	Socorro	LINEAR	·	1.8 km	MPC · JPL
61444 Katokimiko	2000 QB_{25}	Katokimiko	August 25, 2000	Bisei SG Center	BATTeRS	·	2.7 km	MPC · JPL
61445	2000 QF_{25}	—	August 26, 2000	Oakley	Oakley	NYS	3.1 km	MPC · JPL
61446	2000 QH_{27}	—	August 24, 2000	Socorro	LINEAR	·	2.9 km	MPC · JPL
61447	2000 QN_{27}	—	August 24, 2000	Socorro	LINEAR	·	2.8 km	MPC · JPL
61448	2000 QR_{27}	—	August 24, 2000	Socorro	LINEAR	·	2.3 km	MPC · JPL
61449	2000 QX_{27}	—	August 24, 2000	Socorro	LINEAR	·	1.9 km	MPC · JPL
61450	2000 QC_{28}	—	August 24, 2000	Socorro	LINEAR	·	3.9 km	MPC · JPL
61451	2000 QD_{29}	—	August 24, 2000	Socorro	LINEAR	THM	6.7 km	MPC · JPL
61452	2000 QH_{29}	—	August 24, 2000	Socorro	LINEAR	·	2.2 km	MPC · JPL
61453	2000 QL_{29}	—	August 24, 2000	Socorro	LINEAR	·	1.9 km	MPC · JPL
61454	2000 QE_{30}	—	August 25, 2000	Socorro	LINEAR	·	3.2 km	MPC · JPL
61455	2000 QF_{30}	—	August 25, 2000	Socorro	LINEAR	NYS ·	6.2 km	MPC · JPL
61456	2000 QH_{30}	—	August 25, 2000	Socorro	LINEAR	(5)	4.4 km	MPC · JPL
61457	2000 QM_{30}	—	August 25, 2000	Socorro	LINEAR	·	1.8 km	MPC · JPL
61458	2000 QT_{30}	—	August 25, 2000	Socorro	LINEAR	·	3.8 km	MPC · JPL
61459	2000 QW_{30}	—	August 26, 2000	Socorro	LINEAR	·	3.2 km	MPC · JPL
61460	2000 QX_{30}	—	August 26, 2000	Socorro	LINEAR	·	1.4 km	MPC · JPL
61461	2000 QA_{31}	—	August 26, 2000	Socorro	LINEAR	·	5.7 km	MPC · JPL
61462	2000 QH_{31}	—	August 26, 2000	Socorro	LINEAR	·	3.7 km	MPC · JPL
61463	2000 QT_{31}	—	August 26, 2000	Socorro	LINEAR	·	3.2 km	MPC · JPL
61464	2000 QC_{32}	—	August 26, 2000	Socorro	LINEAR	V	2.1 km	MPC · JPL
61465	2000 QY_{32}	—	August 26, 2000	Socorro	LINEAR	·	2.6 km	MPC · JPL
61466	2000 QZ_{32}	—	August 26, 2000	Socorro	LINEAR	·	4.2 km	MPC · JPL
61467	2000 QD_{33}	—	August 26, 2000	Socorro	LINEAR	·	7.1 km	MPC · JPL
61468	2000 QM_{33}	—	August 26, 2000	Socorro	LINEAR	V	1.4 km	MPC · JPL
61469	2000 QJ_{35}	—	August 23, 2000	Nachi-Katsuura	Y. Shimizu, T. Urata	·	5.7 km	MPC · JPL
61470	2000 QK_{35}	—	August 27, 2000	Bisei SG Center	BATTeRS	·	3.8 km	MPC · JPL
61471	2000 QQ_{35}	—	August 28, 2000	Višnjan Observatory	K. Korlević	ERI	4.4 km	MPC · JPL
61472	2000 QS_{35}	—	August 28, 2000	Farra d'Isonzo	Farra d'Isonzo	THM	8.1 km	MPC · JPL
61473	2000 QT_{35}	—	August 29, 2000	Farra d'Isonzo	Farra d'Isonzo	HOF	7.5 km	MPC · JPL
61474	2000 QA_{36}	—	August 24, 2000	Socorro	LINEAR	EUN	3.6 km	MPC · JPL
61475	2000 QH_{37}	—	August 24, 2000	Socorro	LINEAR	·	4.7 km	MPC · JPL
61476	2000 QJ_{37}	—	August 24, 2000	Socorro	LINEAR	·	3.6 km	MPC · JPL
61477	2000 QS_{37}	—	August 24, 2000	Socorro	LINEAR	DOR	6.2 km	MPC · JPL
61478	2000 QC_{38}	—	August 24, 2000	Socorro	LINEAR	·	1.6 km	MPC · JPL
61479	2000 QH_{39}	—	August 24, 2000	Socorro	LINEAR	·	2.8 km	MPC · JPL
61480	2000 QY_{39}	—	August 24, 2000	Socorro	LINEAR	EOS	4.8 km	MPC · JPL
61481	2000 QN_{40}	—	August 24, 2000	Socorro	LINEAR	HOF	6.5 km	MPC · JPL
61482	2000 QU_{40}	—	August 24, 2000	Socorro	LINEAR	·	1.9 km	MPC · JPL
61483	2000 QP_{41}	—	August 24, 2000	Socorro	LINEAR	·	4.2 km	MPC · JPL
61484	2000 QY_{41}	—	August 24, 2000	Socorro	LINEAR	·	4.0 km	MPC · JPL
61485	2000 QH_{42}	—	August 24, 2000	Socorro	LINEAR	·	3.0 km	MPC · JPL
61486	2000 QQ_{42}	—	August 24, 2000	Socorro	LINEAR	KOR	3.1 km	MPC · JPL
61487	2000 QB_{43}	—	August 24, 2000	Socorro	LINEAR	·	3.0 km	MPC · JPL
61488	2000 QB_{45}	—	August 24, 2000	Socorro	LINEAR	·	2.1 km	MPC · JPL
61489	2000 QN_{46}	—	August 24, 2000	Socorro	LINEAR	KOR	2.7 km	MPC · JPL
61490	2000 QH_{47}	—	August 24, 2000	Socorro	LINEAR	PAD	4.3 km	MPC · JPL
61491	2000 QJ_{47}	—	August 24, 2000	Socorro	LINEAR	·	2.8 km	MPC · JPL
61492	2000 QL_{48}	—	August 24, 2000	Socorro	LINEAR	MAS	2.7 km	MPC · JPL
61493	2000 QO_{48}	—	August 24, 2000	Socorro	LINEAR	·	2.8 km	MPC · JPL
61494	2000 QG_{49}	—	August 24, 2000	Socorro	LINEAR	·	3.0 km	MPC · JPL
61495	2000 QJ_{49}	—	August 24, 2000	Socorro	LINEAR	·	1.6 km	MPC · JPL
61496	2000 QO_{49}	—	August 24, 2000	Socorro	LINEAR	·	4.0 km	MPC · JPL
61497	2000 QH_{50}	—	August 24, 2000	Socorro	LINEAR	KOR ·	2.5 km	MPC · JPL
61498	2000 QM_{50}	—	August 24, 2000	Socorro	LINEAR	MAR	2.8 km	MPC · JPL
61499	2000 QD_{51}	—	August 24, 2000	Socorro	LINEAR	KOR	2.7 km	MPC · JPL
61500	2000 QV_{51}	—	August 24, 2000	Socorro	LINEAR	NYS ·	4.4 km	MPC · JPL

== 61501–61600 ==
back to top

Designation			Discovery			Properties		Ref
Permanent	Provisional	Named after	Date	Site	Discoverer(s)	Category	Diam.	Ref
61501	2000 QB_{52}	—	August 24, 2000	Socorro	LINEAR	NYS ·	4.2 km	MPC · JPL
61502	2000 QM_{53}	—	August 25, 2000	Socorro	LINEAR	·	4.9 km	MPC · JPL
61503	2000 QN_{53}	—	August 25, 2000	Socorro	LINEAR	·	2.7 km	MPC · JPL
61504	2000 QS_{53}	—	August 25, 2000	Socorro	LINEAR	·	1.9 km	MPC · JPL
61505	2000 QX_{53}	—	August 25, 2000	Socorro	LINEAR	·	1.9 km	MPC · JPL
61506	2000 QQ_{54}	—	August 25, 2000	Socorro	LINEAR	NYS	3.7 km	MPC · JPL
61507	2000 QS_{54}	—	August 25, 2000	Socorro	LINEAR	·	2.9 km	MPC · JPL
61508	2000 QZ_{54}	—	August 25, 2000	Socorro	LINEAR	AGN	3.1 km	MPC · JPL
61509	2000 QC_{55}	—	August 25, 2000	Socorro	LINEAR	·	4.5 km	MPC · JPL
61510	2000 QF_{55}	—	August 25, 2000	Socorro	LINEAR	(5)	2.5 km	MPC · JPL
61511	2000 QG_{55}	—	August 25, 2000	Socorro	LINEAR	·	3.2 km	MPC · JPL
61512	2000 QD_{57}	—	August 26, 2000	Socorro	LINEAR	·	2.1 km	MPC · JPL
61513	2000 QP_{57}	—	August 26, 2000	Socorro	LINEAR	KOR	2.8 km	MPC · JPL
61514	2000 QU_{57}	—	August 26, 2000	Socorro	LINEAR	SUL	4.9 km	MPC · JPL
61515	2000 QY_{57}	—	August 26, 2000	Socorro	LINEAR	·	2.5 km	MPC · JPL
61516	2000 QA_{58}	—	August 26, 2000	Socorro	LINEAR	·	2.1 km	MPC · JPL
61517	2000 QC_{58}	—	August 26, 2000	Socorro	LINEAR	·	2.8 km	MPC · JPL
61518	2000 QZ_{58}	—	August 26, 2000	Socorro	LINEAR	·	4.1 km	MPC · JPL
61519	2000 QE_{59}	—	August 26, 2000	Socorro	LINEAR	·	3.8 km	MPC · JPL
61520	2000 QH_{59}	—	August 26, 2000	Socorro	LINEAR	MAR	2.4 km	MPC · JPL
61521	2000 QJ_{59}	—	August 26, 2000	Socorro	LINEAR	·	2.3 km	MPC · JPL
61522	2000 QL_{59}	—	August 26, 2000	Socorro	LINEAR	·	2.7 km	MPC · JPL
61523	2000 QO_{60}	—	August 26, 2000	Socorro	LINEAR	·	4.3 km	MPC · JPL
61524	2000 QR_{60}	—	August 26, 2000	Socorro	LINEAR	·	2.1 km	MPC · JPL
61525	2000 QA_{61}	—	August 26, 2000	Socorro	LINEAR	·	6.2 km	MPC · JPL
61526	2000 QL_{61}	—	August 28, 2000	Socorro	LINEAR	·	5.2 km	MPC · JPL
61527	2000 QP_{61}	—	August 28, 2000	Socorro	LINEAR	·	4.1 km	MPC · JPL
61528	2000 QU_{61}	—	August 28, 2000	Socorro	LINEAR	V	1.6 km	MPC · JPL
61529	2000 QY_{61}	—	August 28, 2000	Socorro	LINEAR	NYS	3.0 km	MPC · JPL
61530	2000 QJ_{62}	—	August 28, 2000	Socorro	LINEAR	·	2.7 km	MPC · JPL
61531	2000 QR_{62}	—	August 28, 2000	Socorro	LINEAR	·	4.7 km	MPC · JPL
61532	2000 QS_{62}	—	August 28, 2000	Socorro	LINEAR	·	6.7 km	MPC · JPL
61533	2000 QC_{63}	—	August 28, 2000	Socorro	LINEAR	DOR	9.0 km	MPC · JPL
61534	2000 QJ_{63}	—	August 28, 2000	Socorro	LINEAR	·	4.0 km	MPC · JPL
61535	2000 QN_{63}	—	August 28, 2000	Socorro	LINEAR	·	3.0 km	MPC · JPL
61536	2000 QR_{63}	—	August 28, 2000	Socorro	LINEAR	V	2.9 km	MPC · JPL
61537	2000 QZ_{63}	—	August 28, 2000	Socorro	LINEAR	V	1.5 km	MPC · JPL
61538	2000 QA_{64}	—	August 28, 2000	Socorro	LINEAR	·	4.6 km	MPC · JPL
61539	2000 QB_{64}	—	August 28, 2000	Socorro	LINEAR	·	2.2 km	MPC · JPL
61540	2000 QD_{64}	—	August 28, 2000	Socorro	LINEAR	·	2.6 km	MPC · JPL
61541	2000 QF_{64}	—	August 28, 2000	Socorro	LINEAR	·	9.8 km	MPC · JPL
61542	2000 QH_{64}	—	August 28, 2000	Socorro	LINEAR	·	3.3 km	MPC · JPL
61543	2000 QM_{64}	—	August 28, 2000	Socorro	LINEAR	·	5.7 km	MPC · JPL
61544	2000 QZ_{64}	—	August 28, 2000	Socorro	LINEAR	·	5.0 km	MPC · JPL
61545	2000 QD_{65}	—	August 28, 2000	Socorro	LINEAR	·	2.7 km	MPC · JPL
61546	2000 QT_{65}	—	August 28, 2000	Socorro	LINEAR	·	3.9 km	MPC · JPL
61547	2000 QO_{66}	—	August 28, 2000	Socorro	LINEAR	·	2.6 km	MPC · JPL
61548	2000 QW_{67}	—	August 28, 2000	Socorro	LINEAR	EOS	6.1 km	MPC · JPL
61549	2000 QJ_{68}	—	August 28, 2000	Reedy Creek	J. Broughton	MAR	4.3 km	MPC · JPL
61550	2000 QK_{70}	—	August 28, 2000	Socorro	LINEAR	·	2.1 km	MPC · JPL
61551	2000 QJ_{71}	—	August 24, 2000	Socorro	LINEAR	·	7.3 km	MPC · JPL
61552	2000 QT_{71}	—	August 24, 2000	Socorro	LINEAR	NYS	3.0 km	MPC · JPL
61553	2000 QE_{72}	—	August 24, 2000	Socorro	LINEAR	·	3.2 km	MPC · JPL
61554	2000 QH_{72}	—	August 24, 2000	Socorro	LINEAR	·	1.4 km	MPC · JPL
61555	2000 QC_{73}	—	August 24, 2000	Socorro	LINEAR	·	3.6 km	MPC · JPL
61556	2000 QY_{73}	—	August 24, 2000	Socorro	LINEAR	·	2.9 km	MPC · JPL
61557	2000 QG_{74}	—	August 24, 2000	Socorro	LINEAR	PAD	3.9 km	MPC · JPL
61558	2000 QM_{74}	—	August 24, 2000	Socorro	LINEAR	AGN	2.5 km	MPC · JPL
61559	2000 QQ_{74}	—	August 24, 2000	Socorro	LINEAR	NYS	1.4 km	MPC · JPL
61560	2000 QT_{74}	—	August 24, 2000	Socorro	LINEAR	NYS ·	3.3 km	MPC · JPL
61561	2000 QY_{74}	—	August 24, 2000	Socorro	LINEAR	·	3.4 km	MPC · JPL
61562	2000 QR_{75}	—	August 24, 2000	Socorro	LINEAR	·	2.2 km	MPC · JPL
61563	2000 QU_{75}	—	August 24, 2000	Socorro	LINEAR	·	4.3 km	MPC · JPL
61564	2000 QA_{76}	—	August 24, 2000	Socorro	LINEAR	·	2.9 km	MPC · JPL
61565	2000 QB_{76}	—	August 24, 2000	Socorro	LINEAR	·	2.9 km	MPC · JPL
61566	2000 QR_{76}	—	August 24, 2000	Socorro	LINEAR	·	7.3 km	MPC · JPL
61567	2000 QW_{76}	—	August 24, 2000	Socorro	LINEAR	HYG	6.4 km	MPC · JPL
61568	2000 QB_{77}	—	August 24, 2000	Socorro	LINEAR	·	3.7 km	MPC · JPL
61569	2000 QL_{77}	—	August 24, 2000	Socorro	LINEAR	·	3.3 km	MPC · JPL
61570	2000 QQ_{77}	—	August 24, 2000	Socorro	LINEAR	·	4.6 km	MPC · JPL
61571	2000 QD_{78}	—	August 24, 2000	Socorro	LINEAR	KOR	3.4 km	MPC · JPL
61572	2000 QA_{79}	—	August 24, 2000	Socorro	LINEAR	·	4.4 km	MPC · JPL
61573	2000 QB_{79}	—	August 24, 2000	Socorro	LINEAR	NYS	2.2 km	MPC · JPL
61574	2000 QE_{79}	—	August 24, 2000	Socorro	LINEAR	·	2.2 km	MPC · JPL
61575	2000 QW_{79}	—	August 24, 2000	Socorro	LINEAR	·	3.5 km	MPC · JPL
61576	2000 QG_{80}	—	August 24, 2000	Socorro	LINEAR	HYG	7.8 km	MPC · JPL
61577	2000 QL_{81}	—	August 24, 2000	Socorro	LINEAR	·	3.3 km	MPC · JPL
61578	2000 QU_{81}	—	August 24, 2000	Socorro	LINEAR	·	4.0 km	MPC · JPL
61579	2000 QZ_{81}	—	August 24, 2000	Socorro	LINEAR	(5)	3.1 km	MPC · JPL
61580	2000 QP_{82}	—	August 24, 2000	Socorro	LINEAR	·	4.6 km	MPC · JPL
61581	2000 QR_{82}	—	August 24, 2000	Socorro	LINEAR	·	1.6 km	MPC · JPL
61582	2000 QX_{82}	—	August 24, 2000	Socorro	LINEAR	HYG	9.2 km	MPC · JPL
61583	2000 QH_{83}	—	August 24, 2000	Socorro	LINEAR	·	2.0 km	MPC · JPL
61584	2000 QR_{83}	—	August 24, 2000	Socorro	LINEAR	·	6.8 km	MPC · JPL
61585	2000 QB_{84}	—	August 24, 2000	Socorro	LINEAR	(5)	2.2 km	MPC · JPL
61586	2000 QC_{84}	—	August 24, 2000	Socorro	LINEAR	NYS	3.6 km	MPC · JPL
61587	2000 QJ_{84}	—	August 24, 2000	Socorro	LINEAR	AGN	2.6 km	MPC · JPL
61588	2000 QD_{85}	—	August 25, 2000	Socorro	LINEAR	V	1.5 km	MPC · JPL
61589	2000 QL_{85}	—	August 25, 2000	Socorro	LINEAR	·	3.8 km	MPC · JPL
61590	2000 QR_{85}	—	August 25, 2000	Socorro	LINEAR	NEM	6.4 km	MPC · JPL
61591	2000 QS_{86}	—	August 25, 2000	Socorro	LINEAR	EOS	4.4 km	MPC · JPL
61592	2000 QT_{86}	—	August 25, 2000	Socorro	LINEAR	·	1.7 km	MPC · JPL
61593	2000 QZ_{87}	—	August 25, 2000	Socorro	LINEAR	·	3.8 km	MPC · JPL
61594	2000 QB_{88}	—	August 25, 2000	Socorro	LINEAR	·	3.3 km	MPC · JPL
61595	2000 QT_{89}	—	August 25, 2000	Socorro	LINEAR	HYG	8.3 km	MPC · JPL
61596	2000 QV_{89}	—	August 25, 2000	Socorro	LINEAR	·	2.0 km	MPC · JPL
61597	2000 QW_{90}	—	August 25, 2000	Socorro	LINEAR	·	2.0 km	MPC · JPL
61598	2000 QJ_{91}	—	August 25, 2000	Socorro	LINEAR	·	2.8 km	MPC · JPL
61599	2000 QR_{91}	—	August 25, 2000	Socorro	LINEAR	·	2.7 km	MPC · JPL
61600	2000 QS_{91}	—	August 25, 2000	Socorro	LINEAR	·	2.6 km	MPC · JPL

== 61601–61700 ==
back to top

Designation			Discovery			Properties		Ref
Permanent	Provisional	Named after	Date	Site	Discoverer(s)	Category	Diam.	Ref
61601	2000 QW_{91}	—	August 25, 2000	Socorro	LINEAR	·	3.6 km	MPC · JPL
61602	2000 QB_{92}	—	August 25, 2000	Socorro	LINEAR	·	6.6 km	MPC · JPL
61603	2000 QL_{92}	—	August 25, 2000	Socorro	LINEAR	·	5.4 km	MPC · JPL
61604	2000 QO_{92}	—	August 25, 2000	Socorro	LINEAR	GEF	3.5 km	MPC · JPL
61605	2000 QQ_{92}	—	August 25, 2000	Socorro	LINEAR	HOF	6.2 km	MPC · JPL
61606	2000 QR_{92}	—	August 25, 2000	Socorro	LINEAR	·	3.1 km	MPC · JPL
61607	2000 QD_{93}	—	August 25, 2000	Socorro	LINEAR	EUN	3.2 km	MPC · JPL
61608	2000 QQ_{93}	—	August 26, 2000	Socorro	LINEAR	·	4.1 km	MPC · JPL
61609	2000 QQ_{94}	—	August 26, 2000	Socorro	LINEAR	NYS ·	3.6 km	MPC · JPL
61610	2000 QK_{95}	—	August 26, 2000	Socorro	LINEAR	L5	16 km	MPC · JPL
61611	2000 QR_{96}	—	August 28, 2000	Socorro	LINEAR	·	4.9 km	MPC · JPL
61612	2000 QC_{97}	—	August 28, 2000	Socorro	LINEAR	NEM	5.3 km	MPC · JPL
61613	2000 QY_{97}	—	August 28, 2000	Socorro	LINEAR	·	5.6 km	MPC · JPL
61614	2000 QC_{98}	—	August 28, 2000	Socorro	LINEAR	·	6.7 km	MPC · JPL
61615	2000 QE_{98}	—	August 28, 2000	Socorro	LINEAR	·	1.8 km	MPC · JPL
61616	2000 QH_{98}	—	August 28, 2000	Socorro	LINEAR	HYG	6.8 km	MPC · JPL
61617	2000 QJ_{98}	—	August 28, 2000	Socorro	LINEAR	NYS	3.1 km	MPC · JPL
61618	2000 QT_{98}	—	August 28, 2000	Socorro	LINEAR	·	4.6 km	MPC · JPL
61619	2000 QA_{99}	—	August 28, 2000	Socorro	LINEAR	·	7.3 km	MPC · JPL
61620	2000 QW_{100}	—	August 28, 2000	Socorro	LINEAR	·	3.9 km	MPC · JPL
61621	2000 QY_{100}	—	August 28, 2000	Socorro	LINEAR	·	2.2 km	MPC · JPL
61622	2000 QD_{101}	—	August 28, 2000	Socorro	LINEAR	EOS	4.7 km	MPC · JPL
61623	2000 QP_{101}	—	August 28, 2000	Socorro	LINEAR	·	4.3 km	MPC · JPL
61624	2000 QQ_{101}	—	August 28, 2000	Socorro	LINEAR	·	4.0 km	MPC · JPL
61625	2000 QW_{101}	—	August 28, 2000	Socorro	LINEAR	·	6.2 km	MPC · JPL
61626	2000 QA_{102}	—	August 28, 2000	Socorro	LINEAR	EUN	2.9 km	MPC · JPL
61627	2000 QD_{102}	—	August 28, 2000	Socorro	LINEAR	EOS	5.4 km	MPC · JPL
61628	2000 QF_{102}	—	August 28, 2000	Socorro	LINEAR	·	3.1 km	MPC · JPL
61629	2000 QK_{102}	—	August 28, 2000	Socorro	LINEAR	V	1.6 km	MPC · JPL
61630	2000 QP_{102}	—	August 28, 2000	Socorro	LINEAR	·	2.8 km	MPC · JPL
61631	2000 QX_{102}	—	August 28, 2000	Socorro	LINEAR	·	5.7 km	MPC · JPL
61632	2000 QZ_{102}	—	August 28, 2000	Socorro	LINEAR	·	5.2 km	MPC · JPL
61633	2000 QG_{103}	—	August 28, 2000	Socorro	LINEAR	·	3.1 km	MPC · JPL
61634	2000 QY_{103}	—	August 28, 2000	Socorro	LINEAR	·	6.6 km	MPC · JPL
61635	2000 QA_{104}	—	August 28, 2000	Socorro	LINEAR	·	3.3 km	MPC · JPL
61636	2000 QD_{104}	—	August 28, 2000	Socorro	LINEAR	·	3.2 km	MPC · JPL
61637	2000 QJ_{104}	—	August 28, 2000	Socorro	LINEAR	·	3.0 km	MPC · JPL
61638	2000 QO_{104}	—	August 28, 2000	Socorro	LINEAR	V	1.7 km	MPC · JPL
61639	2000 QX_{104}	—	August 28, 2000	Socorro	LINEAR	EUN · slow	3.2 km	MPC · JPL
61640	2000 QT_{105}	—	August 28, 2000	Socorro	LINEAR	·	9.6 km	MPC · JPL
61641	2000 QS_{106}	—	August 29, 2000	Socorro	LINEAR	V	1.8 km	MPC · JPL
61642	2000 QE_{107}	—	August 29, 2000	Socorro	LINEAR	HYG	7.8 km	MPC · JPL
61643	2000 QN_{108}	—	August 29, 2000	Socorro	LINEAR	·	2.0 km	MPC · JPL
61644	2000 QE_{109}	—	August 29, 2000	Socorro	LINEAR	EUN	3.2 km	MPC · JPL
61645	2000 QT_{109}	—	August 27, 2000	Ondřejov	P. Kušnirák, P. Pravec	·	3.0 km	MPC · JPL
61646	2000 QC_{110}	—	August 24, 2000	Socorro	LINEAR	·	1.6 km	MPC · JPL
61647	2000 QJ_{110}	—	August 24, 2000	Socorro	LINEAR	NEM	5.3 km	MPC · JPL
61648	2000 QK_{111}	—	August 24, 2000	Socorro	LINEAR	·	4.4 km	MPC · JPL
61649	2000 QO_{111}	—	August 24, 2000	Socorro	LINEAR	·	4.4 km	MPC · JPL
61650	2000 QQ_{111}	—	August 24, 2000	Socorro	LINEAR	·	4.3 km	MPC · JPL
61651	2000 QW_{111}	—	August 24, 2000	Socorro	LINEAR	·	8.2 km	MPC · JPL
61652	2000 QO_{112}	—	August 24, 2000	Socorro	LINEAR	·	3.0 km	MPC · JPL
61653	2000 QU_{112}	—	August 24, 2000	Socorro	LINEAR	·	3.6 km	MPC · JPL
61654	2000 QB_{113}	—	August 24, 2000	Socorro	LINEAR	TEL	3.1 km	MPC · JPL
61655	2000 QF_{113}	—	August 24, 2000	Socorro	LINEAR	·	3.4 km	MPC · JPL
61656	2000 QR_{113}	—	August 24, 2000	Socorro	LINEAR	·	3.4 km	MPC · JPL
61657	2000 QZ_{113}	—	August 24, 2000	Socorro	LINEAR	·	3.7 km	MPC · JPL
61658	2000 QJ_{114}	—	August 24, 2000	Socorro	LINEAR	NYS ·	3.7 km	MPC · JPL
61659	2000 QK_{114}	—	August 24, 2000	Socorro	LINEAR	·	2.5 km	MPC · JPL
61660	2000 QP_{114}	—	August 24, 2000	Socorro	LINEAR	EOS	4.7 km	MPC · JPL
61661	2000 QC_{115}	—	August 24, 2000	Socorro	LINEAR	(2076)	2.7 km	MPC · JPL
61662	2000 QQ_{115}	—	August 25, 2000	Socorro	LINEAR	(5)	2.9 km	MPC · JPL
61663	2000 QB_{116}	—	August 26, 2000	Socorro	LINEAR	·	2.7 km	MPC · JPL
61664	2000 QE_{116}	—	August 28, 2000	Socorro	LINEAR	WIT	2.7 km	MPC · JPL
61665	2000 QZ_{116}	—	August 29, 2000	Socorro	LINEAR	·	2.0 km	MPC · JPL
61666	2000 QS_{117}	—	August 30, 2000	Farra d'Isonzo	Farra d'Isonzo	EOS	6.2 km	MPC · JPL
61667	2000 QD_{118}	—	August 25, 2000	Socorro	LINEAR	·	3.5 km	MPC · JPL
61668	2000 QF_{118}	—	August 25, 2000	Socorro	LINEAR	EOS	4.8 km	MPC · JPL
61669	2000 QR_{118}	—	August 25, 2000	Socorro	LINEAR	EOS	4.4 km	MPC · JPL
61670	2000 QA_{119}	—	August 25, 2000	Socorro	LINEAR	·	3.3 km	MPC · JPL
61671	2000 QH_{119}	—	August 25, 2000	Socorro	LINEAR	·	2.8 km	MPC · JPL
61672	2000 QQ_{120}	—	August 25, 2000	Socorro	LINEAR	·	5.4 km	MPC · JPL
61673	2000 QN_{121}	—	August 25, 2000	Socorro	LINEAR	(5)	2.6 km	MPC · JPL
61674	2000 QX_{121}	—	August 25, 2000	Socorro	LINEAR	·	8.2 km	MPC · JPL
61675	2000 QQ_{122}	—	August 25, 2000	Socorro	LINEAR	·	2.2 km	MPC · JPL
61676	2000 QM_{123}	—	August 25, 2000	Socorro	LINEAR	HNS	4.7 km	MPC · JPL
61677	2000 QC_{124}	—	August 26, 2000	Socorro	LINEAR	EOS	3.8 km	MPC · JPL
61678	2000 QE_{124}	—	August 26, 2000	Socorro	LINEAR	EOS	5.3 km	MPC · JPL
61679	2000 QH_{124}	—	August 26, 2000	Socorro	LINEAR	·	5.9 km	MPC · JPL
61680	2000 QJ_{124}	—	August 26, 2000	Socorro	LINEAR	·	2.5 km	MPC · JPL
61681	2000 QO_{124}	—	August 29, 2000	Socorro	LINEAR	KOR	3.3 km	MPC · JPL
61682	2000 QV_{124}	—	August 29, 2000	Socorro	LINEAR	V	2.8 km	MPC · JPL
61683	2000 QX_{125}	—	August 31, 2000	Socorro	LINEAR	(5)	2.7 km	MPC · JPL
61684	2000 QB_{126}	—	August 31, 2000	Socorro	LINEAR	·	6.0 km	MPC · JPL
61685	2000 QJ_{126}	—	August 31, 2000	Socorro	LINEAR	NYS	2.7 km	MPC · JPL
61686	2000 QV_{126}	—	August 31, 2000	Socorro	LINEAR	·	3.8 km	MPC · JPL
61687	2000 QY_{126}	—	August 31, 2000	Socorro	LINEAR	·	8.5 km	MPC · JPL
61688	2000 QC_{127}	—	August 24, 2000	Socorro	LINEAR	V	2.2 km	MPC · JPL
61689	2000 QH_{127}	—	August 24, 2000	Socorro	LINEAR	EUN	3.8 km	MPC · JPL
61690	2000 QV_{127}	—	August 24, 2000	Socorro	LINEAR	·	4.7 km	MPC · JPL
61691	2000 QV_{128}	—	August 25, 2000	Socorro	LINEAR	·	6.4 km	MPC · JPL
61692	2000 QE_{129}	—	August 31, 2000	Socorro	LINEAR	·	3.2 km	MPC · JPL
61693	2000 QT_{130}	—	August 24, 2000	Socorro	LINEAR	·	6.2 km	MPC · JPL
61694	2000 QB_{132}	—	August 31, 2000	Socorro	LINEAR	KOR	3.3 km	MPC · JPL
61695	2000 QD_{132}	—	August 26, 2000	Socorro	LINEAR	·	1.4 km	MPC · JPL
61696	2000 QL_{132}	—	August 26, 2000	Socorro	LINEAR	NYS ·	4.2 km	MPC · JPL
61697	2000 QR_{132}	—	August 26, 2000	Socorro	LINEAR	·	2.9 km	MPC · JPL
61698	2000 QU_{132}	—	August 26, 2000	Socorro	LINEAR	·	3.9 km	MPC · JPL
61699	2000 QV_{132}	—	August 26, 2000	Socorro	LINEAR	·	2.0 km	MPC · JPL
61700	2000 QG_{133}	—	August 26, 2000	Socorro	LINEAR	·	8.6 km	MPC · JPL

== 61701–61800 ==
back to top

Designation			Discovery			Properties		Ref
Permanent	Provisional	Named after	Date	Site	Discoverer(s)	Category	Diam.	Ref
61701	2000 QH_{133}	—	August 26, 2000	Socorro	LINEAR	·	2.8 km	MPC · JPL
61702	2000 QL_{133}	—	August 26, 2000	Socorro	LINEAR	·	2.4 km	MPC · JPL
61703	2000 QW_{133}	—	August 26, 2000	Socorro	LINEAR	NYS	3.1 km	MPC · JPL
61704	2000 QN_{134}	—	August 26, 2000	Socorro	LINEAR	·	2.7 km	MPC · JPL
61705	2000 QZ_{134}	—	August 26, 2000	Socorro	LINEAR	·	2.3 km	MPC · JPL
61706	2000 QD_{136}	—	August 28, 2000	Socorro	LINEAR	·	2.8 km	MPC · JPL
61707	2000 QU_{137}	—	August 31, 2000	Socorro	LINEAR	V	1.2 km	MPC · JPL
61708	2000 QF_{138}	—	August 31, 2000	Socorro	LINEAR	·	5.9 km	MPC · JPL
61709	2000 QM_{138}	—	August 31, 2000	Socorro	LINEAR	·	1.8 km	MPC · JPL
61710	2000 QQ_{138}	—	August 31, 2000	Socorro	LINEAR	·	5.8 km	MPC · JPL
61711	2000 QR_{139}	—	August 31, 2000	Socorro	LINEAR	·	2.9 km	MPC · JPL
61712	2000 QT_{139}	—	August 31, 2000	Socorro	LINEAR	·	5.7 km	MPC · JPL
61713	2000 QJ_{141}	—	August 31, 2000	Socorro	LINEAR	·	3.4 km	MPC · JPL
61714	2000 QW_{141}	—	August 31, 2000	Socorro	LINEAR	MAS	2.0 km	MPC · JPL
61715	2000 QX_{141}	—	August 31, 2000	Socorro	LINEAR	·	3.2 km	MPC · JPL
61716	2000 QC_{142}	—	August 31, 2000	Socorro	LINEAR	EOS	5.6 km	MPC · JPL
61717	2000 QU_{142}	—	August 31, 2000	Socorro	LINEAR	·	2.5 km	MPC · JPL
61718	2000 QY_{142}	—	August 31, 2000	Socorro	LINEAR	HOF	7.8 km	MPC · JPL
61719	2000 QK_{143}	—	August 31, 2000	Socorro	LINEAR	·	3.2 km	MPC · JPL
61720	2000 QM_{143}	—	August 31, 2000	Socorro	LINEAR	·	3.1 km	MPC · JPL
61721	2000 QT_{144}	—	August 31, 2000	Socorro	LINEAR	·	4.1 km	MPC · JPL
61722	2000 QY_{144}	—	August 31, 2000	Socorro	LINEAR	·	7.7 km	MPC · JPL
61723	2000 QJ_{145}	—	August 31, 2000	Socorro	LINEAR	·	3.0 km	MPC · JPL
61724	2000 QL_{145}	—	August 31, 2000	Socorro	LINEAR	NYS	3.1 km	MPC · JPL
61725	2000 QY_{145}	—	August 31, 2000	Socorro	LINEAR	GEF	4.1 km	MPC · JPL
61726	2000 QK_{146}	—	August 31, 2000	Socorro	LINEAR	·	6.3 km	MPC · JPL
61727	2000 QU_{146}	—	August 31, 2000	Socorro	LINEAR	TEL	3.0 km	MPC · JPL
61728	2000 QT_{147}	—	August 31, 2000	Socorro	LINEAR	GAL	3.7 km	MPC · JPL
61729	2000 QX_{147}	—	August 31, 2000	Socorro	LINEAR	HNS	2.7 km	MPC · JPL
61730	2000 QJ_{148}	—	August 27, 2000	Kvistaberg	Uppsala-DLR Asteroid Survey	·	3.0 km	MPC · JPL
61731	2000 QV_{148}	—	August 29, 2000	Siding Spring	R. H. McNaught	·	6.9 km	MPC · JPL
61732	2000 QB_{150}	—	August 25, 2000	Socorro	LINEAR	EOS	4.0 km	MPC · JPL
61733	2000 QU_{150}	—	August 25, 2000	Socorro	LINEAR	EUN	4.7 km	MPC · JPL
61734	2000 QA_{151}	—	August 25, 2000	Socorro	LINEAR	V	1.9 km	MPC · JPL
61735	2000 QQ_{151}	—	August 26, 2000	Socorro	LINEAR	·	1.4 km	MPC · JPL
61736	2000 QL_{152}	—	August 29, 2000	Socorro	LINEAR	·	4.2 km	MPC · JPL
61737	2000 QQ_{152}	—	August 29, 2000	Socorro	LINEAR	EOS	4.3 km	MPC · JPL
61738	2000 QS_{152}	—	August 29, 2000	Socorro	LINEAR	·	1.4 km	MPC · JPL
61739	2000 QT_{152}	—	August 29, 2000	Socorro	LINEAR	·	2.2 km	MPC · JPL
61740	2000 QD_{153}	—	August 29, 2000	Socorro	LINEAR	PAD	4.1 km	MPC · JPL
61741	2000 QK_{153}	—	August 29, 2000	Socorro	LINEAR	·	1.7 km	MPC · JPL
61742	2000 QM_{153}	—	August 29, 2000	Socorro	LINEAR	·	3.3 km	MPC · JPL
61743	2000 QV_{153}	—	August 29, 2000	Socorro	LINEAR	·	4.2 km	MPC · JPL
61744	2000 QD_{154}	—	August 31, 2000	Socorro	LINEAR	·	4.4 km	MPC · JPL
61745	2000 QF_{154}	—	August 31, 2000	Socorro	LINEAR	·	3.4 km	MPC · JPL
61746	2000 QB_{155}	—	August 31, 2000	Socorro	LINEAR	·	4.3 km	MPC · JPL
61747	2000 QJ_{155}	—	August 31, 2000	Socorro	LINEAR	·	5.7 km	MPC · JPL
61748	2000 QY_{155}	—	August 31, 2000	Socorro	LINEAR	GEF	3.3 km	MPC · JPL
61749	2000 QU_{156}	—	August 31, 2000	Socorro	LINEAR	·	3.6 km	MPC · JPL
61750	2000 QD_{157}	—	August 31, 2000	Socorro	LINEAR	slow	3.0 km	MPC · JPL
61751	2000 QN_{157}	—	August 31, 2000	Socorro	LINEAR	·	3.3 km	MPC · JPL
61752	2000 QT_{157}	—	August 31, 2000	Socorro	LINEAR	·	2.7 km	MPC · JPL
61753	2000 QD_{159}	—	August 31, 2000	Socorro	LINEAR	URS	6.7 km	MPC · JPL
61754	2000 QP_{159}	—	August 31, 2000	Socorro	LINEAR	·	4.4 km	MPC · JPL
61755	2000 QE_{160}	—	August 31, 2000	Socorro	LINEAR	·	3.5 km	MPC · JPL
61756	2000 QJ_{160}	—	August 31, 2000	Socorro	LINEAR	·	1.7 km	MPC · JPL
61757	2000 QS_{160}	—	August 31, 2000	Socorro	LINEAR	V	1.7 km	MPC · JPL
61758	2000 QA_{164}	—	August 31, 2000	Socorro	LINEAR	·	3.8 km	MPC · JPL
61759	2000 QB_{164}	—	August 31, 2000	Socorro	LINEAR	·	5.0 km	MPC · JPL
61760	2000 QG_{165}	—	August 31, 2000	Socorro	LINEAR	·	5.1 km	MPC · JPL
61761	2000 QS_{165}	—	August 31, 2000	Socorro	LINEAR	·	4.4 km	MPC · JPL
61762	2000 QT_{165}	—	August 31, 2000	Socorro	LINEAR	·	4.6 km	MPC · JPL
61763	2000 QF_{166}	—	August 31, 2000	Socorro	LINEAR	·	3.5 km	MPC · JPL
61764	2000 QT_{166}	—	August 31, 2000	Socorro	LINEAR	PAD	4.2 km	MPC · JPL
61765	2000 QA_{167}	—	August 31, 2000	Socorro	LINEAR	·	3.5 km	MPC · JPL
61766	2000 QX_{167}	—	August 31, 2000	Socorro	LINEAR	·	3.0 km	MPC · JPL
61767	2000 QB_{168}	—	August 31, 2000	Socorro	LINEAR	·	5.1 km	MPC · JPL
61768	2000 QK_{168}	—	August 31, 2000	Socorro	LINEAR	·	2.8 km	MPC · JPL
61769	2000 QM_{168}	—	August 31, 2000	Socorro	LINEAR	·	7.2 km	MPC · JPL
61770	2000 QE_{170}	—	August 31, 2000	Socorro	LINEAR	EOS	4.4 km	MPC · JPL
61771	2000 QJ_{170}	—	August 31, 2000	Socorro	LINEAR	·	1.7 km	MPC · JPL
61772	2000 QL_{170}	—	August 31, 2000	Socorro	LINEAR	SUL	4.1 km	MPC · JPL
61773	2000 QJ_{171}	—	August 31, 2000	Socorro	LINEAR	·	5.3 km	MPC · JPL
61774	2000 QV_{171}	—	August 31, 2000	Socorro	LINEAR	·	8.7 km	MPC · JPL
61775	2000 QK_{172}	—	August 31, 2000	Socorro	LINEAR	·	2.8 km	MPC · JPL
61776	2000 QP_{172}	—	August 31, 2000	Socorro	LINEAR	·	3.0 km	MPC · JPL
61777	2000 QW_{172}	—	August 31, 2000	Socorro	LINEAR	fast	2.9 km	MPC · JPL
61778	2000 QA_{174}	—	August 31, 2000	Socorro	LINEAR	·	2.4 km	MPC · JPL
61779	2000 QV_{174}	—	August 31, 2000	Socorro	LINEAR	EOS	4.1 km	MPC · JPL
61780	2000 QQ_{175}	—	August 31, 2000	Socorro	LINEAR	·	2.3 km	MPC · JPL
61781	2000 QH_{177}	—	August 31, 2000	Socorro	LINEAR	GEF	3.2 km	MPC · JPL
61782	2000 QN_{177}	—	August 31, 2000	Socorro	LINEAR	·	3.2 km	MPC · JPL
61783	2000 QU_{177}	—	August 31, 2000	Socorro	LINEAR	·	3.1 km	MPC · JPL
61784	2000 QL_{178}	—	August 31, 2000	Socorro	LINEAR	·	5.2 km	MPC · JPL
61785	2000 QM_{178}	—	August 31, 2000	Socorro	LINEAR	·	6.2 km	MPC · JPL
61786	2000 QZ_{178}	—	August 31, 2000	Socorro	LINEAR	·	5.2 km	MPC · JPL
61787	2000 QK_{179}	—	August 31, 2000	Socorro	LINEAR	·	4.7 km	MPC · JPL
61788	2000 QP_{181}	—	August 31, 2000	Socorro	LINEAR	PHO	6.2 km	MPC · JPL
61789	2000 QM_{182}	—	August 31, 2000	Socorro	LINEAR	·	8.0 km	MPC · JPL
61790	2000 QO_{182}	—	August 31, 2000	Socorro	LINEAR	·	3.1 km	MPC · JPL
61791	2000 QV_{182}	—	August 31, 2000	Socorro	LINEAR	·	3.7 km	MPC · JPL
61792	2000 QA_{183}	—	August 31, 2000	Socorro	LINEAR	HOF	5.6 km	MPC · JPL
61793	2000 QB_{183}	—	August 31, 2000	Socorro	LINEAR	EOS	3.8 km	MPC · JPL
61794	2000 QD_{183}	—	August 24, 2000	Socorro	LINEAR	·	3.3 km	MPC · JPL
61795	2000 QF_{183}	—	August 24, 2000	Socorro	LINEAR	·	3.1 km	MPC · JPL
61796	2000 QM_{183}	—	August 24, 2000	Socorro	LINEAR	·	3.8 km	MPC · JPL
61797	2000 QO_{183}	—	August 25, 2000	Socorro	LINEAR	·	2.1 km	MPC · JPL
61798	2000 QY_{183}	—	August 26, 2000	Socorro	LINEAR	·	3.8 km	MPC · JPL
61799	2000 QC_{184}	—	August 26, 2000	Socorro	LINEAR	slow	2.9 km	MPC · JPL
61800	2000 QU_{184}	—	August 26, 2000	Socorro	LINEAR	EUN	3.2 km	MPC · JPL

== 61801–61900 ==
back to top

Designation			Discovery			Properties		Ref
Permanent	Provisional	Named after	Date	Site	Discoverer(s)	Category	Diam.	Ref
61801	2000 QV_{184}	—	August 26, 2000	Socorro	LINEAR	·	2.4 km	MPC · JPL
61802	2000 QA_{185}	—	August 26, 2000	Socorro	LINEAR	TEL	3.0 km	MPC · JPL
61803	2000 QL_{185}	—	August 26, 2000	Socorro	LINEAR	PHO	2.2 km	MPC · JPL
61804	2000 QO_{185}	—	August 26, 2000	Socorro	LINEAR	V	2.0 km	MPC · JPL
61805	2000 QR_{185}	—	August 26, 2000	Socorro	LINEAR	SUL	4.0 km	MPC · JPL
61806	2000 QZ_{185}	—	August 26, 2000	Socorro	LINEAR	(5)	2.9 km	MPC · JPL
61807	2000 QC_{186}	—	August 26, 2000	Socorro	LINEAR	·	3.2 km	MPC · JPL
61808	2000 QD_{187}	—	August 26, 2000	Socorro	LINEAR	·	1.8 km	MPC · JPL
61809	2000 QG_{187}	—	August 26, 2000	Socorro	LINEAR	·	3.3 km	MPC · JPL
61810	2000 QM_{187}	—	August 26, 2000	Socorro	LINEAR	·	2.0 km	MPC · JPL
61811	2000 QQ_{187}	—	August 26, 2000	Socorro	LINEAR	V	2.2 km	MPC · JPL
61812	2000 QP_{189}	—	August 26, 2000	Socorro	LINEAR	·	2.9 km	MPC · JPL
61813	2000 QQ_{189}	—	August 26, 2000	Socorro	LINEAR	·	2.7 km	MPC · JPL
61814	2000 QX_{189}	—	August 26, 2000	Socorro	LINEAR	·	2.2 km	MPC · JPL
61815	2000 QZ_{189}	—	August 26, 2000	Socorro	LINEAR	ERI	5.2 km	MPC · JPL
61816	2000 QR_{190}	—	August 26, 2000	Socorro	LINEAR	·	2.0 km	MPC · JPL
61817	2000 QV_{190}	—	August 26, 2000	Socorro	LINEAR	·	3.4 km	MPC · JPL
61818	2000 QW_{190}	—	August 26, 2000	Socorro	LINEAR	·	1.8 km	MPC · JPL
61819	2000 QT_{191}	—	August 26, 2000	Socorro	LINEAR	·	1.6 km	MPC · JPL
61820	2000 QV_{191}	—	August 26, 2000	Socorro	LINEAR	SYL · CYB	8.9 km	MPC · JPL
61821	2000 QW_{191}	—	August 26, 2000	Socorro	LINEAR	·	3.3 km	MPC · JPL
61822	2000 QF_{192}	—	August 26, 2000	Socorro	LINEAR	·	7.0 km	MPC · JPL
61823	2000 QF_{193}	—	August 29, 2000	Socorro	LINEAR	THM	5.5 km	MPC · JPL
61824	2000 QU_{193}	—	August 29, 2000	Socorro	LINEAR	·	4.9 km	MPC · JPL
61825	2000 QV_{193}	—	August 29, 2000	Socorro	LINEAR	AGN	3.1 km	MPC · JPL
61826	2000 QC_{194}	—	August 31, 2000	Socorro	LINEAR	NYS	4.4 km	MPC · JPL
61827	2000 QZ_{194}	—	August 26, 2000	Socorro	LINEAR	·	2.8 km	MPC · JPL
61828	2000 QC_{195}	—	August 26, 2000	Socorro	LINEAR	·	2.6 km	MPC · JPL
61829	2000 QL_{195}	—	August 26, 2000	Socorro	LINEAR	·	2.9 km	MPC · JPL
61830	2000 QA_{196}	—	August 28, 2000	Socorro	LINEAR	·	4.6 km	MPC · JPL
61831	2000 QB_{196}	—	August 28, 2000	Socorro	LINEAR	·	3.6 km	MPC · JPL
61832	2000 QL_{196}	—	August 29, 2000	Socorro	LINEAR	·	3.2 km	MPC · JPL
61833	2000 QM_{196}	—	August 29, 2000	Socorro	LINEAR	·	2.0 km	MPC · JPL
61834	2000 QS_{196}	—	August 29, 2000	Socorro	LINEAR	·	1.9 km	MPC · JPL
61835	2000 QX_{196}	—	August 29, 2000	Socorro	LINEAR	KOR	2.9 km	MPC · JPL
61836	2000 QA_{197}	—	August 29, 2000	Socorro	LINEAR	·	3.7 km	MPC · JPL
61837	2000 QC_{197}	—	August 29, 2000	Socorro	LINEAR	NYS	3.0 km	MPC · JPL
61838	2000 QL_{197}	—	August 29, 2000	Socorro	LINEAR	AST	3.8 km	MPC · JPL
61839	2000 QA_{198}	—	August 29, 2000	Socorro	LINEAR	MAS	1.8 km	MPC · JPL
61840	2000 QL_{198}	—	August 29, 2000	Socorro	LINEAR	(5)	2.5 km	MPC · JPL
61841	2000 QW_{199}	—	August 29, 2000	Socorro	LINEAR	·	5.2 km	MPC · JPL
61842	2000 QE_{200}	—	August 29, 2000	Socorro	LINEAR	·	3.8 km	MPC · JPL
61843	2000 QT_{200}	—	August 29, 2000	Socorro	LINEAR	·	3.2 km	MPC · JPL
61844	2000 QU_{200}	—	August 29, 2000	Socorro	LINEAR	·	7.1 km	MPC · JPL
61845	2000 QW_{200}	—	August 29, 2000	Socorro	LINEAR	·	5.4 km	MPC · JPL
61846	2000 QH_{201}	—	August 29, 2000	Socorro	LINEAR	·	4.8 km	MPC · JPL
61847	2000 QW_{201}	—	August 29, 2000	Socorro	LINEAR	NYS ·	4.3 km	MPC · JPL
61848	2000 QG_{202}	—	August 29, 2000	Socorro	LINEAR	·	6.0 km	MPC · JPL
61849	2000 QP_{202}	—	August 29, 2000	Socorro	LINEAR	NYS	3.1 km	MPC · JPL
61850 Christophbrunner	2000 QZ_{202}	Christophbrunner	August 29, 2000	Socorro	LINEAR	(5)	2.9 km	MPC · JPL
61851	2000 QA_{204}	—	August 29, 2000	Socorro	LINEAR	·	1.8 km	MPC · JPL
61852	2000 QB_{204}	—	August 29, 2000	Socorro	LINEAR	KOR	3.1 km	MPC · JPL
61853	2000 QO_{204}	—	August 31, 2000	Socorro	LINEAR	·	3.1 km	MPC · JPL
61854	2000 QQ_{204}	—	August 31, 2000	Socorro	LINEAR	·	8.1 km	MPC · JPL
61855	2000 QE_{205}	—	August 31, 2000	Socorro	LINEAR	KOR	3.1 km	MPC · JPL
61856	2000 QJ_{205}	—	August 31, 2000	Socorro	LINEAR	·	4.9 km	MPC · JPL
61857	2000 QL_{205}	—	August 31, 2000	Socorro	LINEAR	KOR	3.3 km	MPC · JPL
61858	2000 QM_{205}	—	August 31, 2000	Socorro	LINEAR	NYS	2.4 km	MPC · JPL
61859	2000 QS_{205}	—	August 31, 2000	Socorro	LINEAR	·	6.1 km	MPC · JPL
61860	2000 QT_{205}	—	August 31, 2000	Socorro	LINEAR	·	2.2 km	MPC · JPL
61861	2000 QA_{207}	—	August 31, 2000	Socorro	LINEAR	·	3.8 km	MPC · JPL
61862	2000 QA_{208}	—	August 31, 2000	Socorro	LINEAR	EOS	3.4 km	MPC · JPL
61863	2000 QJ_{208}	—	August 31, 2000	Socorro	LINEAR	MAS	1.7 km	MPC · JPL
61864	2000 QL_{208}	—	August 31, 2000	Socorro	LINEAR	·	5.1 km	MPC · JPL
61865	2000 QO_{210}	—	August 31, 2000	Socorro	LINEAR	KOR	3.0 km	MPC · JPL
61866	2000 QE_{211}	—	August 31, 2000	Socorro	LINEAR	·	3.5 km	MPC · JPL
61867	2000 QQ_{211}	—	August 31, 2000	Socorro	LINEAR	·	2.7 km	MPC · JPL
61868	2000 QN_{212}	—	August 31, 2000	Socorro	LINEAR	·	3.6 km	MPC · JPL
61869	2000 QO_{212}	—	August 31, 2000	Socorro	LINEAR	·	4.2 km	MPC · JPL
61870	2000 QV_{212}	—	August 31, 2000	Socorro	LINEAR	·	3.3 km	MPC · JPL
61871	2000 QE_{213}	—	August 31, 2000	Socorro	LINEAR	·	3.0 km	MPC · JPL
61872	2000 QH_{213}	—	August 31, 2000	Socorro	LINEAR	KOR	3.6 km	MPC · JPL
61873	2000 QN_{213}	—	August 31, 2000	Socorro	LINEAR	·	4.5 km	MPC · JPL
61874	2000 QX_{213}	—	August 31, 2000	Socorro	LINEAR	·	4.0 km	MPC · JPL
61875	2000 QS_{214}	—	August 31, 2000	Socorro	LINEAR	·	1.7 km	MPC · JPL
61876	2000 QN_{215}	—	August 31, 2000	Socorro	LINEAR	KOR	3.6 km	MPC · JPL
61877	2000 QU_{215}	—	August 31, 2000	Socorro	LINEAR	·	5.0 km	MPC · JPL
61878	2000 QD_{216}	—	August 31, 2000	Socorro	LINEAR	EOS	4.4 km	MPC · JPL
61879	2000 QQ_{216}	—	August 31, 2000	Socorro	LINEAR	·	4.5 km	MPC · JPL
61880	2000 QC_{217}	—	August 31, 2000	Socorro	LINEAR	EOS	4.0 km	MPC · JPL
61881	2000 QS_{217}	—	August 31, 2000	Socorro	LINEAR	·	3.9 km	MPC · JPL
61882	2000 QA_{218}	—	August 31, 2000	Socorro	LINEAR	·	6.2 km	MPC · JPL
61883	2000 QU_{218}	—	August 20, 2000	Anderson Mesa	LONEOS	·	1.9 km	MPC · JPL
61884	2000 QJ_{219}	—	August 20, 2000	Anderson Mesa	LONEOS	THM	5.2 km	MPC · JPL
61885	2000 QN_{219}	—	August 20, 2000	Anderson Mesa	LONEOS	·	3.8 km	MPC · JPL
61886	2000 QV_{219}	—	August 20, 2000	Anderson Mesa	LONEOS	·	2.3 km	MPC · JPL
61887	2000 QF_{220}	—	August 21, 2000	Anderson Mesa	LONEOS	·	3.7 km	MPC · JPL
61888	2000 QO_{220}	—	August 21, 2000	Anderson Mesa	LONEOS	·	4.1 km	MPC · JPL
61889	2000 QL_{221}	—	August 21, 2000	Anderson Mesa	LONEOS	·	2.4 km	MPC · JPL
61890	2000 QZ_{221}	—	August 21, 2000	Anderson Mesa	LONEOS	·	2.0 km	MPC · JPL
61891	2000 QO_{222}	—	August 21, 2000	Anderson Mesa	LONEOS	·	2.1 km	MPC · JPL
61892	2000 QQ_{222}	—	August 21, 2000	Anderson Mesa	LONEOS	·	2.9 km	MPC · JPL
61893	2000 QX_{222}	—	August 21, 2000	Anderson Mesa	LONEOS	·	2.2 km	MPC · JPL
61894	2000 QT_{224}	—	August 26, 2000	Haleakala	NEAT	·	4.3 km	MPC · JPL
61895	2000 QV_{224}	—	August 26, 2000	Haleakala	NEAT	·	4.8 km	MPC · JPL
61896	2000 QG_{227}	—	August 31, 2000	Socorro	LINEAR	L5	18 km	MPC · JPL
61897	2000 QY_{227}	—	August 31, 2000	Socorro	LINEAR	·	1.8 km	MPC · JPL
61898	2000 QZ_{227}	—	August 31, 2000	Socorro	LINEAR	V · fast	1.6 km	MPC · JPL
61899	2000 QN_{228}	—	August 31, 2000	Socorro	LINEAR	·	3.4 km	MPC · JPL
61900	2000 QQ_{228}	—	August 31, 2000	Socorro	LINEAR	·	5.8 km	MPC · JPL

== 61901–62000 ==
back to top

Designation			Discovery			Properties		Ref
Permanent	Provisional	Named after	Date	Site	Discoverer(s)	Category	Diam.	Ref
61901	2000 QX_{228}	—	August 31, 2000	Socorro	LINEAR	·	4.7 km	MPC · JPL
61902	2000 QH_{229}	—	August 31, 2000	Socorro	LINEAR	EOS	3.5 km	MPC · JPL
61903	2000 QA_{230}	—	August 31, 2000	Socorro	LINEAR	·	2.7 km	MPC · JPL
61904	2000 QD_{230}	—	August 31, 2000	Socorro	LINEAR	·	3.5 km	MPC · JPL
61905	2000 QF_{230}	—	August 31, 2000	Socorro	LINEAR	·	4.6 km	MPC · JPL
61906	2000 QJ_{230}	—	August 31, 2000	Socorro	LINEAR	·	5.0 km	MPC · JPL
61907	2000 QK_{230}	—	August 31, 2000	Socorro	LINEAR	·	4.0 km	MPC · JPL
61908	2000 QT_{230}	—	August 31, 2000	Socorro	LINEAR	·	2.6 km	MPC · JPL
61909	2000 QR_{231}	—	August 29, 2000	Socorro	LINEAR	(5)	1.8 km	MPC · JPL
61910	2000 QW_{243}	—	August 21, 2000	Anderson Mesa	LONEOS	·	5.6 km	MPC · JPL
61911	2000 QP_{244}	—	August 25, 2000	Cerro Tololo	M. W. Buie	NYS ·	3.1 km	MPC · JPL
61912 Storrs	2000 QC_{247}	Storrs	August 27, 2000	Cerro Tololo	Kern, S. D.	·	4.3 km	MPC · JPL
61913 Lanning	2000 QJ_{248}	Lanning	August 28, 2000	Cerro Tololo	Kern, S. D.	·	3.0 km	MPC · JPL
61914	2000 RK	—	September 1, 2000	Socorro	LINEAR	·	3.9 km	MPC · JPL
61915	2000 RO	—	September 1, 2000	Socorro	LINEAR	·	6.4 km	MPC · JPL
61916	2000 RB_{1}	—	September 1, 2000	Socorro	LINEAR	·	3.3 km	MPC · JPL
61917	2000 RH_{1}	—	September 1, 2000	Socorro	LINEAR	NYS	2.4 km	MPC · JPL
61918	2000 RR_{1}	—	September 1, 2000	Socorro	LINEAR	·	4.9 km	MPC · JPL
61919	2000 RU_{1}	—	September 1, 2000	Socorro	LINEAR	NYS ·	4.5 km	MPC · JPL
61920	2000 RV_{1}	—	September 1, 2000	Socorro	LINEAR	NYS	2.5 km	MPC · JPL
61921	2000 RW_{1}	—	September 1, 2000	Socorro	LINEAR	·	1.7 km	MPC · JPL
61922	2000 RA_{2}	—	September 1, 2000	Socorro	LINEAR	·	3.8 km	MPC · JPL
61923	2000 RF_{2}	—	September 1, 2000	Socorro	LINEAR	·	1.5 km	MPC · JPL
61924	2000 RL_{2}	—	September 1, 2000	Socorro	LINEAR	HYG	10 km	MPC · JPL
61925	2000 RA_{3}	—	September 1, 2000	Socorro	LINEAR	slow ·	8.2 km	MPC · JPL
61926	2000 RN_{3}	—	September 1, 2000	Socorro	LINEAR	EOS	5.2 km	MPC · JPL
61927	2000 RZ_{3}	—	September 1, 2000	Socorro	LINEAR	GEF	3.4 km	MPC · JPL
61928	2000 RP_{4}	—	September 1, 2000	Socorro	LINEAR	(1547)	3.0 km	MPC · JPL
61929	2000 RB_{5}	—	September 1, 2000	Socorro	LINEAR	·	3.3 km	MPC · JPL
61930	2000 RP_{5}	—	September 1, 2000	Socorro	LINEAR	·	10 km	MPC · JPL
61931	2000 RS_{5}	—	September 1, 2000	Socorro	LINEAR	NYS	3.2 km	MPC · JPL
61932	2000 RN_{6}	—	September 1, 2000	Socorro	LINEAR	·	1.3 km	MPC · JPL
61933	2000 RR_{6}	—	September 1, 2000	Socorro	LINEAR	·	5.1 km	MPC · JPL
61934	2000 RA_{7}	—	September 1, 2000	Socorro	LINEAR	·	1.8 km	MPC · JPL
61935	2000 RT_{7}	—	September 1, 2000	Socorro	LINEAR	HYG	10 km	MPC · JPL
61936	2000 RZ_{7}	—	September 1, 2000	Socorro	LINEAR	·	2.7 km	MPC · JPL
61937	2000 RK_{9}	—	September 1, 2000	Socorro	LINEAR	·	5.0 km	MPC · JPL
61938	2000 RT_{9}	—	September 1, 2000	Socorro	LINEAR	·	3.4 km	MPC · JPL
61939	2000 RA_{11}	—	September 1, 2000	Socorro	LINEAR	·	3.2 km	MPC · JPL
61940	2000 RB_{11}	—	September 1, 2000	Socorro	LINEAR	·	4.8 km	MPC · JPL
61941	2000 RE_{11}	—	September 1, 2000	Socorro	LINEAR	·	3.1 km	MPC · JPL
61942	2000 RP_{12}	—	September 2, 2000	Višnjan Observatory	K. Korlević	·	2.1 km	MPC · JPL
61943	2000 RT_{12}	—	September 1, 2000	Socorro	LINEAR	·	3.0 km	MPC · JPL
61944	2000 RM_{13}	—	September 1, 2000	Socorro	LINEAR	·	2.2 km	MPC · JPL
61945	2000 RO_{13}	—	September 1, 2000	Socorro	LINEAR	EOS	4.6 km	MPC · JPL
61946	2000 RQ_{13}	—	September 1, 2000	Socorro	LINEAR	EUN	2.6 km	MPC · JPL
61947	2000 RG_{14}	—	September 1, 2000	Socorro	LINEAR	EOS	5.0 km	MPC · JPL
61948	2000 RA_{15}	—	September 1, 2000	Socorro	LINEAR	·	8.3 km	MPC · JPL
61949	2000 RL_{16}	—	September 1, 2000	Socorro	LINEAR	·	3.7 km	MPC · JPL
61950	2000 RQ_{16}	—	September 1, 2000	Socorro	LINEAR	·	8.1 km	MPC · JPL
61951	2000 RE_{17}	—	September 1, 2000	Socorro	LINEAR	·	3.4 km	MPC · JPL
61952	2000 RG_{17}	—	September 1, 2000	Socorro	LINEAR	·	3.5 km	MPC · JPL
61953	2000 RK_{17}	—	September 1, 2000	Socorro	LINEAR	EOS	5.1 km	MPC · JPL
61954	2000 RB_{18}	—	September 1, 2000	Socorro	LINEAR	·	5.0 km	MPC · JPL
61955	2000 RK_{18}	—	September 1, 2000	Socorro	LINEAR	·	3.2 km	MPC · JPL
61956	2000 RS_{18}	—	September 1, 2000	Socorro	LINEAR	PHO	2.1 km	MPC · JPL
61957	2000 RE_{19}	—	September 1, 2000	Socorro	LINEAR	URS	11 km	MPC · JPL
61958	2000 RR_{19}	—	September 1, 2000	Socorro	LINEAR	·	5.7 km	MPC · JPL
61959	2000 RS_{19}	—	September 1, 2000	Socorro	LINEAR	·	7.8 km	MPC · JPL
61960	2000 RV_{19}	—	September 1, 2000	Socorro	LINEAR	·	9.1 km	MPC · JPL
61961	2000 RC_{20}	—	September 1, 2000	Socorro	LINEAR	EOS	6.5 km	MPC · JPL
61962	2000 RV_{20}	—	September 1, 2000	Socorro	LINEAR	·	3.6 km	MPC · JPL
61963	2000 RY_{20}	—	September 1, 2000	Socorro	LINEAR	·	5.0 km	MPC · JPL
61964	2000 RQ_{21}	—	September 1, 2000	Socorro	LINEAR	·	3.4 km	MPC · JPL
61965	2000 RS_{22}	—	September 1, 2000	Socorro	LINEAR	EOS	5.4 km	MPC · JPL
61966	2000 RU_{22}	—	September 1, 2000	Socorro	LINEAR	(5)	4.0 km	MPC · JPL
61967	2000 RV_{23}	—	September 1, 2000	Socorro	LINEAR	·	4.8 km	MPC · JPL
61968	2000 RW_{23}	—	September 1, 2000	Socorro	LINEAR	·	2.5 km	MPC · JPL
61969	2000 RG_{24}	—	September 1, 2000	Socorro	LINEAR	·	3.1 km	MPC · JPL
61970	2000 RV_{24}	—	September 1, 2000	Socorro	LINEAR	EOS	4.1 km	MPC · JPL
61971	2000 RW_{24}	—	September 1, 2000	Socorro	LINEAR	·	1.5 km	MPC · JPL
61972	2000 RB_{26}	—	September 1, 2000	Socorro	LINEAR	·	2.5 km	MPC · JPL
61973	2000 RY_{26}	—	September 1, 2000	Socorro	LINEAR	EOS	4.6 km	MPC · JPL
61974	2000 RC_{27}	—	September 1, 2000	Socorro	LINEAR	·	4.8 km	MPC · JPL
61975	2000 RJ_{27}	—	September 1, 2000	Socorro	LINEAR	EOS	5.9 km	MPC · JPL
61976	2000 RS_{27}	—	September 1, 2000	Socorro	LINEAR	·	3.1 km	MPC · JPL
61977	2000 RK_{28}	—	September 1, 2000	Socorro	LINEAR	·	3.4 km	MPC · JPL
61978	2000 RN_{28}	—	September 1, 2000	Socorro	LINEAR	PAD	3.9 km	MPC · JPL
61979	2000 RO_{28}	—	September 1, 2000	Socorro	LINEAR	·	2.4 km	MPC · JPL
61980	2000 RZ_{29}	—	September 1, 2000	Socorro	LINEAR	·	4.9 km	MPC · JPL
61981	2000 RB_{30}	—	September 1, 2000	Socorro	LINEAR	·	4.5 km	MPC · JPL
61982	2000 RL_{30}	—	September 1, 2000	Socorro	LINEAR	·	5.8 km	MPC · JPL
61983	2000 RN_{30}	—	September 1, 2000	Socorro	LINEAR	·	3.5 km	MPC · JPL
61984	2000 RR_{30}	—	September 1, 2000	Socorro	LINEAR	·	7.3 km	MPC · JPL
61985	2000 RW_{30}	—	September 1, 2000	Socorro	LINEAR	·	4.3 km	MPC · JPL
61986	2000 RY_{30}	—	September 1, 2000	Socorro	LINEAR	V	3.1 km	MPC · JPL
61987	2000 RD_{31}	—	September 1, 2000	Socorro	LINEAR	·	6.4 km	MPC · JPL
61988	2000 RN_{32}	—	September 1, 2000	Socorro	LINEAR	·	5.8 km	MPC · JPL
61989	2000 RP_{32}	—	September 1, 2000	Socorro	LINEAR	·	5.7 km	MPC · JPL
61990	2000 RG_{33}	—	September 1, 2000	Socorro	LINEAR	EOS	4.8 km	MPC · JPL
61991	2000 RL_{33}	—	September 1, 2000	Socorro	LINEAR	SUL	6.2 km	MPC · JPL
61992	2000 RN_{33}	—	September 1, 2000	Socorro	LINEAR	·	5.1 km	MPC · JPL
61993	2000 RR_{33}	—	September 1, 2000	Socorro	LINEAR	PAD	4.8 km	MPC · JPL
61994	2000 RT_{33}	—	September 1, 2000	Socorro	LINEAR	ADE	5.9 km	MPC · JPL
61995	2000 RG_{34}	—	September 1, 2000	Socorro	LINEAR	V	1.5 km	MPC · JPL
61996	2000 RO_{34}	—	September 1, 2000	Socorro	LINEAR	·	4.1 km	MPC · JPL
61997	2000 RR_{34}	—	September 1, 2000	Socorro	LINEAR	·	2.7 km	MPC · JPL
61998	2000 RT_{34}	—	September 1, 2000	Socorro	LINEAR	·	2.5 km	MPC · JPL
61999	2000 RT_{35}	—	September 2, 2000	Socorro	LINEAR	·	2.9 km	MPC · JPL
62000	2000 RA_{36}	—	September 3, 2000	Kitt Peak	Spacewatch	·	6.7 km	MPC · JPL

back to top

== See also ==
- Meanings of minor-planet names: 61001–62000
