= Meanings of minor-planet names: 61001–62000 =

As minor planet discoveries are confirmed, they are given a permanent number by the IAU's Minor Planet Center (MPC), and the discoverers can then submit names for them, following the IAU's naming conventions. The list below concerns those minor planets in the specified number-range that have received names, and explains the meanings of those names.

Official naming citations of newly named small Solar System bodies are approved and published in a bulletin by IAU's Working Group for Small Bodies Nomenclature (WGSBN). Before May 2021, citations were published in MPC's Minor Planet Circulars for many decades. Recent citations can also be found on the JPL Small-Body Database (SBDB). Until his death in 2016, German astronomer Lutz D. Schmadel compiled these citations into the Dictionary of Minor Planet Names (DMP) and regularly updated the collection.

Based on Paul Herget's The Names of the Minor Planets, Schmadel also researched the unclear origin of numerous asteroids, most of which had been named prior to World War II. This article incorporates text from this source, which is in the public domain: SBDB New namings may only be added to this list below after official publication as the preannouncement of names is condemned. The WGSBN publishes a comprehensive guideline for the naming rules of non-cometary small Solar System bodies.

== 61001–61100 ==
Named minor planet	Provisional	This minor planet was named for...	Ref; Catalog
61042 Noviello	2000 KB_{61}	Jessica Noviello (born 1992) completed her Ph.D. research at Arizona State University studying surface features on Europa to discern its internal structure. She applies those skills in analyzing the morphology of the asteroid (101955) Bennu for the OSIRIS-REx mission.	IAU · 61042

== 61101–61200 ==
back to top

Named minor planet	Provisional	This minor planet was named for...	Ref; Catalog
61189 Ohsadaharu	2000 NE_{29}	Sadaharu Oh (born 1940), a world-renowned professional baseball player with the world lifetime home run record (868). He also won the World Baseball Classic Champion 2006 as manager of Team Japan.	JPL · 61189
61190 Johnschutt	2000 NF_{29}	John Schutt (born 1948) and American expert mountaineer who served for more than two decades as a member of the yearly field teams sent by the Antarctic Search for Meteorites Program to Antarctica. He played a key role in assuring that the expeditions were executed safely. As a participant he has found over 10,000 "earthbound minor planets" (Src).	JPL · 61190
61195 Martinoli	2000 OU_{2}	Piero Martinoli (born 1941) is professor of physics and leader of the superconductivity research group at the University of Neuchatel.	JPL · 61195

== 61201–61300 ==
back to top

Named minor planet	Provisional	This minor planet was named for...	Ref; Catalog
61208 Stonařov	2000 OD_{8}	Stonařov, Moravia, Czech Republic (Stannern in German), where an eucrite meteorite fell on 1808 May 22, on the occasion of the fall's 200th anniversary	JPL · 61208

== 61301–61400 ==
back to top

Named minor planet	Provisional	This minor planet was named for...	Ref; Catalog
61342 Lovejoy	2000 PJ_{3}	Terry Lovejoy (born 1966), Australian amateur astronomer and comet discoverer who also pioneered comet discovery via the internet in SOHO/LASCO data and through sky patrols using digital cameras.	JPL · 61342
61344 Jicakyoryokutai	2000 PT_{5}	Jicakyoryokutai, which means “Jica volunteer” in Japanese, is the name of the volunteer corps of the Japan International Cooperation Agency	IAU · 61344
61384 Arturoromer	2000 QW	Arturo Romer (born 1944), a Swiss physicist and mathematician. He directed the Liceo Cantonale Locarno and is now director of the association Electricità della Svizzera Italiana	JPL · 61384
61386 Namikoshi	2000 QT_{1}	Tokujiro Namikoshi (1905–2000), was a Japanese practitioner, who founded the Shiatsu therapy, which involves massage by thumb. His definition of Shiatsu was "The heart of Shiatsu is like a mother's love. Pressure of the finger causes the spring of life to flow".	JPL · 61386
61400 Voxandreae	2000 QM_{6}	Andreae Deman (1945–2008) was an American planetarium narrator at the Von Braun Astronomical Society in Huntsville, Alabama. The "Voice of Andreae" was silenced with her death from leukemia. The asteroid's name, "Voxandreae", is Latin for "Voice of Andreae".	JPL · 61400

== 61401–61500 ==
back to top

Named minor planet	Provisional	This minor planet was named for...	Ref; Catalog
61401 Schiff	2000 QQ_{6}	Leonard Isaac Schiff, (1915–1971) an American theoretical physicist who proposed the use of orbiting gyroscopes to check some of the effects of the theory of general relativity. His ideas led to the Gravity Probe B experiment.	JPL · 61401
61402 Franciseveritt	2000 QS_{6}	Francis Everitt (born 1934), American physicist add professor at Stanford University, who is the principal investigator of the Gravity Probe B experiment.	JPL · 61402
61404 Očenášek	2000 QM_{9}	Ludvík Očenášek (1872–1949), a Czech aviation and rocket pioneer who constructed a radial engine for airplanes and his own monoplane in 1905. He began systematic rocket research in 1928, and in 1930 his two-stage rockets reached an altitude of 1.5 km. He considered the launching of rockets from aircraft and the long-distance rocket delivery of mail.(Src).	JPL · 61404
61444 Katokimiko	2000 QB_{25}	Kimiko Kato (born 1934) is a Japanese amateur astronomer who is committed to education and public outreach regarding small Solar System body impacts on Earth. She also studies impact craters and the K-T boundary in Japan. She has been a member of Japan Spaceguard Association since its establishment.	JPL · 61444

== 61501–61600 ==
back to top

Named minor planet	Provisional	This minor planet was named for...	Ref; Catalog
There are no named minor planets in this number range

== 61601–61700 ==
back to top

Named minor planet	Provisional	This minor planet was named for...	Ref; Catalog
There are no named minor planets in this number range

== 61701–61800 ==
back to top

Named minor planet	Provisional	This minor planet was named for...	Ref; Catalog
There are no named minor planets in this number range

== 61801–61900 ==
back to top

Named minor planet	Provisional	This minor planet was named for...	Ref; Catalog
61850 Christophbrunner	2000 QZ_{202}	Christoph Brunner, Swiss electrical engineer who works on communication for the control of electrical power systems.	IAU · 61850

== 61901–62000 ==
back to top

Named minor planet	Provisional	This minor planet was named for...	Ref; Catalog
61912 Storrs	2000 QC_{247}	Alex Storrs (born 1960) is an American astronomer and professor at Towson State University. He is known for developing innovative techniques for Hubble Space Telescope observations of solar system objects. He also pioneered searches for satellites of minor planets that revealed companions to 87 Sylvia, 107 Camilla and others.	JPL · 61912
61913 Lanning	2000 QJ_{248}	Howard Lanning (1946–2007) an American astronomer who validated astronomical software and assisted other astronomers at Mount Wilson, the National Optical Astronomical Observatories and the Space Telescope Science Institute. He also studied variable stars and catalogued ultraviolet-excess stars in the Sandage Two-color Survey of the Galactic Plane.	JPL · 61913

back to top

Preceded by 60,001–61,000	Meanings of minor-planet names List of minor planets: 61,001–62,000	Succeeded by 62,001–63,000
