= List of minor planets: 64001–65000 =

The following is a partial list of minor planets, running from minor-planet number 64001 through 65000, inclusive. The primary data for this and other partial lists is based on JPL's "Small-Body Orbital Elements" and data available from the Minor Planet Center. Critical list information is also provided by the MPC, unless otherwise specified from Lowell Observatory. A detailed description of the table's columns and additional sources are given on the main page including a complete list of every page in this series, and a statistical break-up on the dynamical classification of minor planets.

Also see the summary list of all named bodies in numerical and alphabetical order, and the corresponding naming citations for the number range of this particular list. New namings may only be added to this list after official publication, as the preannouncement of names is condemned by the Working Group for Small Bodies Nomenclature of the International Astronomical Union.

Near-Earth obj.	MBA (inner)	MBA (outer)	Centaur
Mars-crosser	MBA (middle)	Jupiter trojan	Trans-Neptunian obj.
Unclassified

== 64001–64100 ==
Designation			Discovery			Properties		Ref
Permanent	Provisional	Named after	Date	Site	Discoverer(s)	Category	Diam.	Ref
64001	2001 SU_{115}	—	September 19, 2001	Goodricke-Pigott	R. A. Tucker	·	2.7 km	MPC · JPL
64002	2001 SO_{116}	—	September 18, 2001	Desert Eagle	W. K. Y. Yeung	·	1.6 km	MPC · JPL
64003	2001 SN_{118}	—	September 16, 2001	Socorro	LINEAR	·	1.2 km	MPC · JPL
64004	2001 SZ_{120}	—	September 16, 2001	Socorro	LINEAR	HYG	6.1 km	MPC · JPL
64005	2001 SF_{121}	—	September 16, 2001	Socorro	LINEAR	·	4.3 km	MPC · JPL
64006	2001 SS_{124}	—	September 16, 2001	Socorro	LINEAR	·	5.1 km	MPC · JPL
64007	2001 SF_{126}	—	September 16, 2001	Socorro	LINEAR	·	1.8 km	MPC · JPL
64008	2001 SQ_{126}	—	September 16, 2001	Socorro	LINEAR	·	1.1 km	MPC · JPL
64009	2001 SD_{127}	—	September 16, 2001	Socorro	LINEAR	·	2.0 km	MPC · JPL
64010	2001 SW_{130}	—	September 16, 2001	Socorro	LINEAR	·	2.3 km	MPC · JPL
64011	2001 SX_{134}	—	September 16, 2001	Socorro	LINEAR	·	5.9 km	MPC · JPL
64012	2001 SR_{135}	—	September 16, 2001	Socorro	LINEAR	NYS	2.6 km	MPC · JPL
64013	2001 SF_{140}	—	September 16, 2001	Socorro	LINEAR	·	1.7 km	MPC · JPL
64014	2001 SG_{141}	—	September 16, 2001	Socorro	LINEAR	·	1.2 km	MPC · JPL
64015	2001 SL_{143}	—	September 16, 2001	Socorro	LINEAR	·	2.5 km	MPC · JPL
64016	2001 SX_{144}	—	September 16, 2001	Socorro	LINEAR	·	4.3 km	MPC · JPL
64017	2001 SN_{147}	—	September 17, 2001	Socorro	LINEAR	·	1.7 km	MPC · JPL
64018	2001 SQ_{149}	—	September 17, 2001	Socorro	LINEAR	·	4.0 km	MPC · JPL
64019	2001 SB_{152}	—	September 17, 2001	Socorro	LINEAR	·	6.8 km	MPC · JPL
64020	2001 SN_{152}	—	September 17, 2001	Socorro	LINEAR	NYS	3.0 km	MPC · JPL
64021	2001 SQ_{153}	—	September 17, 2001	Socorro	LINEAR	KOR	3.5 km	MPC · JPL
64022	2001 SU_{153}	—	September 17, 2001	Socorro	LINEAR	V	1.4 km	MPC · JPL
64023	2001 SO_{157}	—	September 17, 2001	Socorro	LINEAR	V	1.6 km	MPC · JPL
64024	2001 SL_{160}	—	September 17, 2001	Socorro	LINEAR	·	5.3 km	MPC · JPL
64025	2001 SB_{161}	—	September 17, 2001	Socorro	LINEAR	·	2.3 km	MPC · JPL
64026	2001 SS_{161}	—	September 17, 2001	Socorro	LINEAR	·	5.6 km	MPC · JPL
64027	2001 SV_{161}	—	September 17, 2001	Socorro	LINEAR	EOS	4.4 km	MPC · JPL
64028	2001 SJ_{163}	—	September 17, 2001	Socorro	LINEAR	·	4.7 km	MPC · JPL
64029	2001 SA_{166}	—	September 19, 2001	Socorro	LINEAR	·	1.9 km	MPC · JPL
64030	2001 SQ_{168}	—	September 19, 2001	Socorro	LINEAR	L5	20 km	MPC · JPL
64031	2001 SV_{169}	—	September 24, 2001	Fountain Hills	C. W. Juels, P. R. Holvorcem	H	2.3 km	MPC · JPL
64032	2001 SF_{172}	—	September 16, 2001	Socorro	LINEAR	·	1.2 km	MPC · JPL
64033	2001 SM_{175}	—	September 16, 2001	Socorro	LINEAR	·	2.0 km	MPC · JPL
64034	2001 SD_{176}	—	September 16, 2001	Socorro	LINEAR	·	7.1 km	MPC · JPL
64035	2001 SB_{179}	—	September 17, 2001	Socorro	LINEAR	EUN	3.2 km	MPC · JPL
64036	2001 SO_{190}	—	September 19, 2001	Socorro	LINEAR	MAS	1.1 km	MPC · JPL
64037	2001 SO_{193}	—	September 19, 2001	Socorro	LINEAR	·	4.4 km	MPC · JPL
64038	2001 SC_{223}	—	September 19, 2001	Socorro	LINEAR	·	1.6 km	MPC · JPL
64039	2001 SG_{223}	—	September 19, 2001	Socorro	LINEAR	·	2.0 km	MPC · JPL
64040	2001 SU_{231}	—	September 19, 2001	Socorro	LINEAR	·	6.0 km	MPC · JPL
64041	2001 SF_{232}	—	September 19, 2001	Socorro	LINEAR	NYS	1.6 km	MPC · JPL
64042	2001 SE_{234}	—	September 19, 2001	Socorro	LINEAR	·	3.1 km	MPC · JPL
64043	2001 SL_{235}	—	September 19, 2001	Socorro	LINEAR	·	3.5 km	MPC · JPL
64044	2001 SS_{238}	—	September 19, 2001	Socorro	LINEAR	·	3.3 km	MPC · JPL
64045	2001 SA_{240}	—	September 19, 2001	Socorro	LINEAR	·	1.3 km	MPC · JPL
64046	2001 SR_{240}	—	September 19, 2001	Socorro	LINEAR	EOS	6.1 km	MPC · JPL
64047	2001 SA_{243}	—	September 19, 2001	Socorro	LINEAR	·	2.2 km	MPC · JPL
64048	2001 SN_{244}	—	September 19, 2001	Socorro	LINEAR	·	4.2 km	MPC · JPL
64049	2001 SQ_{244}	—	September 19, 2001	Socorro	LINEAR	·	3.8 km	MPC · JPL
64050	2001 SK_{245}	—	September 19, 2001	Socorro	LINEAR	·	1.5 km	MPC · JPL
64051	2001 SP_{252}	—	September 19, 2001	Socorro	LINEAR	KOR	3.9 km	MPC · JPL
64052	2001 SX_{253}	—	September 19, 2001	Socorro	LINEAR	·	3.8 km	MPC · JPL
64053	2001 SN_{254}	—	September 19, 2001	Socorro	LINEAR	·	9.1 km	MPC · JPL
64054	2001 SY_{254}	—	September 19, 2001	Socorro	LINEAR	·	2.9 km	MPC · JPL
64055	2001 SR_{255}	—	September 19, 2001	Socorro	LINEAR	MAS	1.4 km	MPC · JPL
64056	2001 SZ_{256}	—	September 19, 2001	Socorro	LINEAR	·	2.8 km	MPC · JPL
64057	2001 SA_{258}	—	September 20, 2001	Socorro	LINEAR	NYS	3.9 km	MPC · JPL
64058	2001 SZ_{260}	—	September 20, 2001	Socorro	LINEAR	·	2.1 km	MPC · JPL
64059	2001 SB_{261}	—	September 20, 2001	Socorro	LINEAR	·	3.6 km	MPC · JPL
64060	2001 SM_{263}	—	September 25, 2001	Fountain Hills	C. W. Juels, P. R. Holvorcem	·	3.6 km	MPC · JPL
64061	2001 SG_{265}	—	September 25, 2001	Desert Eagle	W. K. Y. Yeung	·	2.4 km	MPC · JPL
64062	2001 SB_{266}	—	September 25, 2001	Desert Eagle	W. K. Y. Yeung	·	3.1 km	MPC · JPL
64063	2001 SD_{267}	—	September 25, 2001	Desert Eagle	W. K. Y. Yeung	·	1.9 km	MPC · JPL
64064	2001 SC_{268}	—	September 25, 2001	Desert Eagle	W. K. Y. Yeung	·	1.7 km	MPC · JPL
64065	2001 SF_{268}	—	September 25, 2001	Desert Eagle	W. K. Y. Yeung	·	1.6 km	MPC · JPL
64066	2001 SJ_{268}	—	September 25, 2001	Desert Eagle	W. K. Y. Yeung	·	2.4 km	MPC · JPL
64067	2001 SB_{270}	—	September 18, 2001	Palomar	NEAT	ADE	9.0 km	MPC · JPL
64068	2001 SO_{271}	—	September 20, 2001	Socorro	LINEAR	NYS ·	3.5 km	MPC · JPL
64069	2001 SV_{271}	—	September 20, 2001	Socorro	LINEAR	THM	6.1 km	MPC · JPL
64070 NEAT	2001 SS_{272}	NEAT	September 24, 2001	Fountain Hills	C. W. Juels, P. R. Holvorcem	PHO	3.8 km	MPC · JPL
64071	2001 SQ_{276}	—	September 21, 2001	Palomar	NEAT	·	5.1 km	MPC · JPL
64072	2001 SU_{276}	—	September 21, 2001	Palomar	NEAT	·	1.7 km	MPC · JPL
64073	2001 SV_{277}	—	September 21, 2001	Anderson Mesa	LONEOS	·	10 km	MPC · JPL
64074	2001 SJ_{278}	—	September 21, 2001	Anderson Mesa	LONEOS	·	3.0 km	MPC · JPL
64075	2001 SD_{279}	—	September 21, 2001	Anderson Mesa	LONEOS	·	4.1 km	MPC · JPL
64076	2001 SK_{279}	—	September 21, 2001	Anderson Mesa	LONEOS	·	2.4 km	MPC · JPL
64077	2001 SN_{279}	—	September 21, 2001	Anderson Mesa	LONEOS	·	2.1 km	MPC · JPL
64078	2001 SO_{279}	—	September 21, 2001	Anderson Mesa	LONEOS	NYS	1.9 km	MPC · JPL
64079	2001 SP_{279}	—	September 21, 2001	Anderson Mesa	LONEOS	·	2.3 km	MPC · JPL
64080	2001 SU_{279}	—	September 21, 2001	Anderson Mesa	LONEOS	·	2.8 km	MPC · JPL
64081	2001 SX_{279}	—	September 21, 2001	Anderson Mesa	LONEOS	·	3.6 km	MPC · JPL
64082	2001 SM_{280}	—	September 21, 2001	Anderson Mesa	LONEOS	NYS	2.1 km	MPC · JPL
64083	2001 SP_{280}	—	September 21, 2001	Anderson Mesa	LONEOS	·	2.0 km	MPC · JPL
64084	2001 SA_{283}	—	September 22, 2001	Socorro	LINEAR	EUN	5.5 km	MPC · JPL
64085	2001 SC_{283}	—	September 22, 2001	Socorro	LINEAR	EUN	6.0 km	MPC · JPL
64086	2001 SE_{283}	—	September 22, 2001	Socorro	LINEAR	ADE	5.3 km	MPC · JPL
64087	2001 SH_{285}	—	September 22, 2001	Kitt Peak	Spacewatch	·	1.6 km	MPC · JPL
64088	2001 SX_{285}	—	September 28, 2001	Fountain Hills	C. W. Juels, P. R. Holvorcem	·	4.8 km	MPC · JPL
64089	2001 SA_{288}	—	September 27, 2001	Palomar	NEAT	·	9.1 km	MPC · JPL
64090	2001 SA_{289}	—	September 22, 2001	Goodricke-Pigott	R. A. Tucker	·	5.8 km	MPC · JPL
64091	2001 SL_{289}	—	September 27, 2001	Palomar	NEAT	·	2.5 km	MPC · JPL
64092	2001 SM_{289}	—	September 27, 2001	Palomar	NEAT	·	3.3 km	MPC · JPL
64093	2001 SU_{291}	—	September 17, 2001	Anderson Mesa	LONEOS	·	5.2 km	MPC · JPL
64094	2001 SE_{293}	—	September 17, 2001	Socorro	LINEAR	HYG	4.1 km	MPC · JPL
64095	2001 SB_{320}	—	September 21, 2001	Socorro	LINEAR	MAS · fast	1.5 km	MPC · JPL
64096	2001 SR_{332}	—	September 19, 2001	Kitt Peak	Spacewatch	·	3.0 km	MPC · JPL
64097	2001 SP_{334}	—	September 20, 2001	Socorro	LINEAR	·	7.8 km	MPC · JPL
64098	2001 SD_{341}	—	September 21, 2001	Palomar	NEAT	WIT ·	2.7 km	MPC · JPL
64099	2001 SN_{346}	—	September 25, 2001	Socorro	LINEAR	LIX	7.9 km	MPC · JPL
64100	2001 TY	—	October 9, 2001	Socorro	LINEAR	PHO	4.2 km	MPC · JPL

== 64101–64200 ==
back to top

Designation			Discovery			Properties		Ref
Permanent	Provisional	Named after	Date	Site	Discoverer(s)	Category	Diam.	Ref
64101	2001 TC_{1}	—	October 8, 2001	Palomar	NEAT	·	1.7 km	MPC · JPL
64102	2001 TT_{3}	—	October 7, 2001	Palomar	NEAT	·	1.7 km	MPC · JPL
64103	2001 TW_{3}	—	October 7, 2001	Palomar	NEAT	·	2.0 km	MPC · JPL
64104	2001 TG_{4}	—	October 7, 2001	Palomar	NEAT	·	5.8 km	MPC · JPL
64105	2001 TH_{6}	—	October 10, 2001	Palomar	NEAT	·	7.4 km	MPC · JPL
64106	2001 TT_{7}	—	October 11, 2001	Desert Eagle	W. K. Y. Yeung	(5)	3.1 km	MPC · JPL
64107	2001 TK_{8}	—	October 9, 2001	Socorro	LINEAR	H	1.9 km	MPC · JPL
64108	2001 TU_{8}	—	October 9, 2001	Socorro	LINEAR	·	3.8 km	MPC · JPL
64109	2001 TW_{8}	—	October 9, 2001	Socorro	LINEAR	·	3.3 km	MPC · JPL
64110	2001 TZ_{8}	—	October 9, 2001	Socorro	LINEAR	·	2.5 km	MPC · JPL
64111	2001 TV_{9}	—	October 13, 2001	Socorro	LINEAR	·	2.1 km	MPC · JPL
64112	2001 TF_{10}	—	October 13, 2001	Socorro	LINEAR	MAS	1.7 km	MPC · JPL
64113	2001 TD_{11}	—	October 13, 2001	Socorro	LINEAR	·	6.2 km	MPC · JPL
64114	2001 TE_{12}	—	October 13, 2001	Socorro	LINEAR	NYS	2.3 km	MPC · JPL
64115	2001 TQ_{12}	—	October 13, 2001	Socorro	LINEAR	EUN	4.2 km	MPC · JPL
64116	2001 TX_{13}	—	October 11, 2001	Desert Eagle	W. K. Y. Yeung	·	1.6 km	MPC · JPL
64117	2001 TW_{15}	—	October 11, 2001	Socorro	LINEAR	·	8.2 km	MPC · JPL
64118	2001 TK_{17}	—	October 13, 2001	San Marcello	San Marcello	EOS · slow	5.9 km	MPC · JPL
64119	2001 TX_{17}	—	October 14, 2001	Desert Eagle	W. K. Y. Yeung	·	4.0 km	MPC · JPL
64120	2001 TF_{18}	—	October 14, 2001	Desert Eagle	W. K. Y. Yeung	·	2.8 km	MPC · JPL
64121	2001 TG_{18}	—	October 14, 2001	Desert Eagle	W. K. Y. Yeung	·	3.0 km	MPC · JPL
64122	2001 TL_{18}	—	October 14, 2001	Desert Eagle	W. K. Y. Yeung	·	5.3 km	MPC · JPL
64123	2001 TS_{18}	—	October 15, 2001	Emerald Lane	L. Ball	NYS	2.8 km	MPC · JPL
64124	2001 TA_{21}	—	October 9, 2001	Socorro	LINEAR	·	8.2 km	MPC · JPL
64125	2001 TQ_{21}	—	October 11, 2001	Socorro	LINEAR	·	1.8 km	MPC · JPL
64126	2001 TD_{22}	—	October 13, 2001	Socorro	LINEAR	·	3.4 km	MPC · JPL
64127	2001 TM_{23}	—	October 14, 2001	Socorro	LINEAR	KOR	3.0 km	MPC · JPL
64128	2001 TQ_{24}	—	October 14, 2001	Socorro	LINEAR	·	2.3 km	MPC · JPL
64129	2001 TX_{25}	—	October 14, 2001	Socorro	LINEAR	·	4.1 km	MPC · JPL
64130	2001 TC_{26}	—	October 14, 2001	Socorro	LINEAR	·	5.6 km	MPC · JPL
64131	2001 TP_{26}	—	October 14, 2001	Socorro	LINEAR	·	1.9 km	MPC · JPL
64132	2001 TO_{27}	—	October 14, 2001	Socorro	LINEAR	·	3.2 km	MPC · JPL
64133	2001 TB_{29}	—	October 14, 2001	Socorro	LINEAR	NYS	1.9 km	MPC · JPL
64134	2001 TH_{32}	—	October 14, 2001	Socorro	LINEAR	V	1.6 km	MPC · JPL
64135	2001 TM_{32}	—	October 14, 2001	Socorro	LINEAR	DOR	5.6 km	MPC · JPL
64136	2001 TV_{32}	—	October 14, 2001	Socorro	LINEAR	·	5.9 km	MPC · JPL
64137	2001 TF_{34}	—	October 14, 2001	Socorro	LINEAR	EMA	7.2 km	MPC · JPL
64138	2001 TM_{34}	—	October 14, 2001	Socorro	LINEAR	·	3.3 km	MPC · JPL
64139	2001 TQ_{35}	—	October 14, 2001	Socorro	LINEAR	·	4.4 km	MPC · JPL
64140	2001 TZ_{35}	—	October 14, 2001	Socorro	LINEAR	·	2.9 km	MPC · JPL
64141	2001 TH_{36}	—	October 14, 2001	Socorro	LINEAR	·	2.4 km	MPC · JPL
64142	2001 TO_{36}	—	October 14, 2001	Socorro	LINEAR	·	2.9 km	MPC · JPL
64143	2001 TH_{37}	—	October 14, 2001	Socorro	LINEAR	·	3.6 km	MPC · JPL
64144	2001 TS_{37}	—	October 14, 2001	Socorro	LINEAR	·	2.3 km	MPC · JPL
64145	2001 TZ_{37}	—	October 14, 2001	Socorro	LINEAR	(5)	3.8 km	MPC · JPL
64146	2001 TB_{39}	—	October 14, 2001	Socorro	LINEAR	·	2.2 km	MPC · JPL
64147	2001 TM_{40}	—	October 14, 2001	Socorro	LINEAR	EUN	3.9 km	MPC · JPL
64148	2001 TP_{40}	—	October 14, 2001	Socorro	LINEAR	V	2.8 km	MPC · JPL
64149	2001 TC_{41}	—	October 14, 2001	Socorro	LINEAR	(1338) (FLO)	4.0 km	MPC · JPL
64150	2001 TF_{41}	—	October 14, 2001	Socorro	LINEAR	·	3.1 km	MPC · JPL
64151	2001 TJ_{41}	—	October 14, 2001	Socorro	LINEAR	·	3.4 km	MPC · JPL
64152	2001 TO_{41}	—	October 14, 2001	Socorro	LINEAR	·	4.4 km	MPC · JPL
64153	2001 TR_{41}	—	October 14, 2001	Socorro	LINEAR	EUN	3.5 km	MPC · JPL
64154	2001 TC_{42}	—	October 14, 2001	Socorro	LINEAR	·	2.3 km	MPC · JPL
64155	2001 TH_{42}	—	October 14, 2001	Socorro	LINEAR	·	4.7 km	MPC · JPL
64156	2001 TN_{42}	—	October 14, 2001	Socorro	LINEAR	EUN	3.8 km	MPC · JPL
64157	2001 TR_{42}	—	October 14, 2001	Socorro	LINEAR	·	4.9 km	MPC · JPL
64158	2001 TK_{43}	—	October 14, 2001	Socorro	LINEAR	·	6.3 km	MPC · JPL
64159	2001 TS_{43}	—	October 14, 2001	Socorro	LINEAR	·	6.3 km	MPC · JPL
64160	2001 TB_{44}	—	October 14, 2001	Socorro	LINEAR	EUN	4.1 km	MPC · JPL
64161	2001 TQ_{45}	—	October 14, 2001	Needville	Needville	·	3.4 km	MPC · JPL
64162	2001 TJ_{48}	—	October 9, 2001	Kitt Peak	Spacewatch	·	3.4 km	MPC · JPL
64163	2001 TB_{49}	—	October 15, 2001	Socorro	LINEAR	PHO	3.3 km	MPC · JPL
64164	2001 TL_{49}	—	October 15, 2001	Desert Eagle	W. K. Y. Yeung	V	1.5 km	MPC · JPL
64165	2001 TW_{49}	—	October 13, 2001	Socorro	LINEAR	KOR	2.9 km	MPC · JPL
64166	2001 TA_{50}	—	October 13, 2001	Socorro	LINEAR	·	3.4 km	MPC · JPL
64167	2001 TZ_{50}	—	October 13, 2001	Socorro	LINEAR	·	1.4 km	MPC · JPL
64168	2001 TC_{51}	—	October 13, 2001	Socorro	LINEAR	NYS	2.4 km	MPC · JPL
64169	2001 TA_{52}	—	October 13, 2001	Socorro	LINEAR	·	2.8 km	MPC · JPL
64170	2001 TH_{56}	—	October 15, 2001	Socorro	LINEAR	·	3.5 km	MPC · JPL
64171	2001 TQ_{56}	—	October 14, 2001	Desert Eagle	W. K. Y. Yeung	MAS	1.6 km	MPC · JPL
64172	2001 TH_{58}	—	October 13, 2001	Socorro	LINEAR	·	3.6 km	MPC · JPL
64173	2001 TP_{58}	—	October 13, 2001	Socorro	LINEAR	·	2.3 km	MPC · JPL
64174	2001 TL_{60}	—	October 13, 2001	Socorro	LINEAR	·	2.7 km	MPC · JPL
64175	2001 TT_{61}	—	October 13, 2001	Socorro	LINEAR	·	3.8 km	MPC · JPL
64176	2001 TA_{62}	—	October 13, 2001	Socorro	LINEAR	·	4.1 km	MPC · JPL
64177	2001 TS_{62}	—	October 13, 2001	Socorro	LINEAR	V	1.5 km	MPC · JPL
64178	2001 TO_{63}	—	October 13, 2001	Socorro	LINEAR	NYS	2.6 km	MPC · JPL
64179	2001 TR_{63}	—	October 13, 2001	Socorro	LINEAR	·	3.8 km	MPC · JPL
64180	2001 TR_{64}	—	October 13, 2001	Socorro	LINEAR	·	2.1 km	MPC · JPL
64181	2001 TS_{64}	—	October 13, 2001	Socorro	LINEAR	·	2.2 km	MPC · JPL
64182	2001 TB_{65}	—	October 13, 2001	Socorro	LINEAR	·	4.8 km	MPC · JPL
64183	2001 TP_{66}	—	October 13, 2001	Socorro	LINEAR	·	3.3 km	MPC · JPL
64184	2001 TU_{66}	—	October 13, 2001	Socorro	LINEAR	·	2.1 km	MPC · JPL
64185	2001 TT_{67}	—	October 13, 2001	Socorro	LINEAR	·	1.9 km	MPC · JPL
64186	2001 TB_{68}	—	October 13, 2001	Socorro	LINEAR	·	3.3 km	MPC · JPL
64187	2001 TN_{68}	—	October 13, 2001	Socorro	LINEAR	·	1.8 km	MPC · JPL
64188	2001 TQ_{68}	—	October 13, 2001	Socorro	LINEAR	NYS	1.9 km	MPC · JPL
64189	2001 TN_{69}	—	October 13, 2001	Socorro	LINEAR	MAS	1.5 km	MPC · JPL
64190	2001 TY_{69}	—	October 13, 2001	Socorro	LINEAR	NYS	1.5 km	MPC · JPL
64191	2001 TC_{70}	—	October 13, 2001	Socorro	LINEAR	KOR	2.7 km	MPC · JPL
64192	2001 TL_{70}	—	October 13, 2001	Socorro	LINEAR	·	2.2 km	MPC · JPL
64193	2001 TD_{71}	—	October 13, 2001	Socorro	LINEAR	·	2.0 km	MPC · JPL
64194	2001 TD_{72}	—	October 13, 2001	Socorro	LINEAR	·	2.2 km	MPC · JPL
64195	2001 TE_{74}	—	October 13, 2001	Socorro	LINEAR	·	2.8 km	MPC · JPL
64196	2001 TY_{74}	—	October 13, 2001	Socorro	LINEAR	KOR	2.8 km	MPC · JPL
64197	2001 TD_{75}	—	October 13, 2001	Socorro	LINEAR	MAS	1.7 km	MPC · JPL
64198	2001 TK_{77}	—	October 13, 2001	Socorro	LINEAR	·	3.0 km	MPC · JPL
64199	2001 TU_{77}	—	October 13, 2001	Socorro	LINEAR	·	2.1 km	MPC · JPL
64200	2001 TQ_{79}	—	October 13, 2001	Socorro	LINEAR	·	4.6 km	MPC · JPL

== 64201–64300 ==
back to top

Designation			Discovery			Properties		Ref
Permanent	Provisional	Named after	Date	Site	Discoverer(s)	Category	Diam.	Ref
64201	2001 TG_{80}	—	October 13, 2001	Socorro	LINEAR	·	2.6 km	MPC · JPL
64202	2001 TO_{83}	—	October 14, 2001	Socorro	LINEAR	·	6.6 km	MPC · JPL
64203	2001 TG_{90}	—	October 14, 2001	Socorro	LINEAR	·	2.8 km	MPC · JPL
64204	2001 TT_{92}	—	October 14, 2001	Socorro	LINEAR	·	4.8 km	MPC · JPL
64205	2001 TL_{96}	—	October 14, 2001	Socorro	LINEAR	·	3.5 km	MPC · JPL
64206	2001 TW_{97}	—	October 14, 2001	Socorro	LINEAR	·	3.4 km	MPC · JPL
64207	2001 TO_{99}	—	October 14, 2001	Socorro	LINEAR	·	2.7 km	MPC · JPL
64208	2001 TG_{100}	—	October 14, 2001	Socorro	LINEAR	·	1.7 km	MPC · JPL
64209	2001 TV_{100}	—	October 14, 2001	Socorro	LINEAR	HOF	5.3 km	MPC · JPL
64210	2001 TC_{104}	—	October 15, 2001	Desert Eagle	W. K. Y. Yeung	·	2.3 km	MPC · JPL
64211	2001 TE_{105}	—	October 13, 2001	Socorro	LINEAR	·	1.7 km	MPC · JPL
64212	2001 TM_{105}	—	October 13, 2001	Socorro	LINEAR	·	2.2 km	MPC · JPL
64213	2001 TN_{105}	—	October 13, 2001	Socorro	LINEAR	·	2.7 km	MPC · JPL
64214	2001 TU_{105}	—	October 13, 2001	Socorro	LINEAR	PHO	5.2 km	MPC · JPL
64215	2001 TP_{106}	—	October 13, 2001	Socorro	LINEAR	EUN	6.5 km	MPC · JPL
64216	2001 TQ_{106}	—	October 13, 2001	Socorro	LINEAR	·	4.9 km	MPC · JPL
64217	2001 TR_{106}	—	October 13, 2001	Socorro	LINEAR	·	7.7 km	MPC · JPL
64218	2001 TT_{106}	—	October 13, 2001	Socorro	LINEAR	·	4.1 km	MPC · JPL
64219	2001 TB_{107}	—	October 13, 2001	Socorro	LINEAR	GEF	4.0 km	MPC · JPL
64220	2001 TF_{107}	—	October 13, 2001	Socorro	LINEAR	·	8.8 km	MPC · JPL
64221	2001 TV_{108}	—	October 14, 2001	Socorro	LINEAR	·	8.8 km	MPC · JPL
64222	2001 TB_{110}	—	October 14, 2001	Socorro	LINEAR	·	1.1 km	MPC · JPL
64223	2001 TG_{110}	—	October 14, 2001	Socorro	LINEAR	·	2.0 km	MPC · JPL
64224	2001 TA_{112}	—	October 14, 2001	Socorro	LINEAR	·	1.7 km	MPC · JPL
64225	2001 TD_{112}	—	October 14, 2001	Socorro	LINEAR	·	2.8 km	MPC · JPL
64226	2001 TO_{112}	—	October 14, 2001	Socorro	LINEAR	DOR	6.8 km	MPC · JPL
64227	2001 TG_{115}	—	October 14, 2001	Socorro	LINEAR	·	3.0 km	MPC · JPL
64228	2001 TO_{115}	—	October 14, 2001	Socorro	LINEAR	·	3.9 km	MPC · JPL
64229	2001 TO_{116}	—	October 14, 2001	Socorro	LINEAR	·	4.8 km	MPC · JPL
64230	2001 TC_{117}	—	October 14, 2001	Socorro	LINEAR	·	3.7 km	MPC · JPL
64231	2001 TQ_{117}	—	October 14, 2001	Socorro	LINEAR	·	3.6 km	MPC · JPL
64232	2001 TL_{122}	—	October 15, 2001	Socorro	LINEAR	·	5.5 km	MPC · JPL
64233	2001 TA_{124}	—	October 12, 2001	Haleakala	NEAT	EOS	4.8 km	MPC · JPL
64234	2001 TV_{124}	—	October 12, 2001	Haleakala	NEAT	V	1.4 km	MPC · JPL
64235	2001 TW_{127}	—	October 10, 2001	Palomar	NEAT	·	1.7 km	MPC · JPL
64236	2001 TH_{129}	—	October 14, 2001	Kitt Peak	Spacewatch	·	2.9 km	MPC · JPL
64237	2001 TK_{133}	—	October 12, 2001	Haleakala	NEAT	V	1.3 km	MPC · JPL
64238	2001 TD_{134}	—	October 12, 2001	Haleakala	NEAT	NAE	6.2 km	MPC · JPL
64239	2001 TH_{137}	—	October 14, 2001	Palomar	NEAT	·	5.6 km	MPC · JPL
64240	2001 TN_{137}	—	October 14, 2001	Palomar	NEAT	·	6.5 km	MPC · JPL
64241	2001 TX_{139}	—	October 10, 2001	Palomar	NEAT	·	3.0 km	MPC · JPL
64242	2001 TU_{147}	—	October 10, 2001	Palomar	NEAT	·	2.1 km	MPC · JPL
64243	2001 TJ_{149}	—	October 10, 2001	Palomar	NEAT	·	1.9 km	MPC · JPL
64244	2001 TO_{152}	—	October 10, 2001	Palomar	NEAT	·	6.1 km	MPC · JPL
64245	2001 TR_{159}	—	October 12, 2001	Haleakala	NEAT	·	5.3 km	MPC · JPL
64246	2001 TC_{160}	—	October 15, 2001	Palomar	NEAT	EOS	5.6 km	MPC · JPL
64247	2001 TQ_{164}	—	October 11, 2001	Palomar	NEAT	·	2.1 km	MPC · JPL
64248	2001 TZ_{164}	—	October 15, 2001	Palomar	NEAT	EOS	5.9 km	MPC · JPL
64249	2001 TH_{166}	—	October 15, 2001	Socorro	LINEAR	EOS	4.5 km	MPC · JPL
64250	2001 TV_{167}	—	October 15, 2001	Socorro	LINEAR	V	1.6 km	MPC · JPL
64251	2001 TC_{168}	—	October 15, 2001	Socorro	LINEAR	·	3.1 km	MPC · JPL
64252	2001 TL_{168}	—	October 15, 2001	Socorro	LINEAR	·	2.2 km	MPC · JPL
64253	2001 TV_{168}	—	October 15, 2001	Socorro	LINEAR	·	2.9 km	MPC · JPL
64254	2001 TX_{168}	—	October 15, 2001	Socorro	LINEAR	H · slow	1.3 km	MPC · JPL
64255	2001 TQ_{170}	—	October 13, 2001	Palomar	NEAT	·	3.0 km	MPC · JPL
64256	2001 TG_{171}	—	October 15, 2001	Palomar	NEAT	·	2.1 km	MPC · JPL
64257	2001 TA_{172}	—	October 14, 2001	Socorro	LINEAR	·	3.4 km	MPC · JPL
64258	2001 TB_{174}	—	October 14, 2001	Socorro	LINEAR	V	1.8 km	MPC · JPL
64259	2001 TL_{188}	—	October 14, 2001	Socorro	LINEAR	·	5.7 km	MPC · JPL
64260	2001 TK_{190}	—	October 14, 2001	Socorro	LINEAR	·	1.6 km	MPC · JPL
64261	2001 TN_{190}	—	October 14, 2001	Socorro	LINEAR	·	2.2 km	MPC · JPL
64262	2001 TR_{190}	—	October 14, 2001	Socorro	LINEAR	·	1.8 km	MPC · JPL
64263	2001 TB_{191}	—	October 14, 2001	Socorro	LINEAR	CLO	5.7 km	MPC · JPL
64264	2001 TM_{191}	—	October 14, 2001	Socorro	LINEAR	·	4.9 km	MPC · JPL
64265	2001 TR_{192}	—	October 14, 2001	Socorro	LINEAR	·	2.3 km	MPC · JPL
64266	2001 TX_{192}	—	October 14, 2001	Socorro	LINEAR	·	3.0 km	MPC · JPL
64267	2001 TJ_{194}	—	October 15, 2001	Socorro	LINEAR	H	1.5 km	MPC · JPL
64268	2001 TY_{195}	—	October 15, 2001	Socorro	LINEAR	·	2.8 km	MPC · JPL
64269	2001 TZ_{196}	—	October 15, 2001	Palomar	NEAT	·	3.3 km	MPC · JPL
64270	2001 TA_{197}	—	October 15, 2001	Palomar	NEAT	L5	16 km	MPC · JPL
64271	2001 TV_{202}	—	October 11, 2001	Socorro	LINEAR	EOS	4.8 km	MPC · JPL
64272	2001 TZ_{202}	—	October 11, 2001	Socorro	LINEAR	·	5.6 km	MPC · JPL
64273	2001 TM_{207}	—	October 11, 2001	Socorro	LINEAR	BAR	2.8 km	MPC · JPL
64274	2001 TN_{209}	—	October 12, 2001	Haleakala	NEAT	·	4.9 km	MPC · JPL
64275	2001 TG_{213}	—	October 13, 2001	Anderson Mesa	LONEOS	·	3.9 km	MPC · JPL
64276	2001 TW_{218}	—	October 14, 2001	Anderson Mesa	LONEOS	·	1.5 km	MPC · JPL
64277	2001 TD_{224}	—	October 14, 2001	Socorro	LINEAR	·	2.6 km	MPC · JPL
64278	2001 TT_{225}	—	October 14, 2001	Anderson Mesa	LONEOS	·	3.8 km	MPC · JPL
64279	2001 TF_{233}	—	October 15, 2001	Palomar	NEAT	EOS	7.4 km	MPC · JPL
64280	2001 TC_{235}	—	October 15, 2001	Palomar	NEAT	·	1.6 km	MPC · JPL
64281	2001 TL_{237}	—	October 8, 2001	Palomar	NEAT	·	3.3 km	MPC · JPL
64282	2001 UO_{5}	—	October 21, 2001	Desert Eagle	W. K. Y. Yeung	·	4.0 km	MPC · JPL
64283	2001 UV_{5}	—	October 21, 2001	Desert Eagle	W. K. Y. Yeung	·	2.2 km	MPC · JPL
64284	2001 UE_{6}	—	October 20, 2001	Ametlla de Mar	J. Nomen	·	4.9 km	MPC · JPL
64285	2001 UN_{6}	—	October 17, 2001	Desert Eagle	W. K. Y. Yeung	(12739)	3.9 km	MPC · JPL
64286	2001 UO_{7}	—	October 17, 2001	Socorro	LINEAR	·	3.3 km	MPC · JPL
64287	2001 UX_{9}	—	October 17, 2001	Socorro	LINEAR	GEF	3.6 km	MPC · JPL
64288 Lamchiuying	2001 UL_{10}	Lamchiuying	October 18, 2001	Desert Eagle	W. K. Y. Yeung	NYS	2.7 km	MPC · JPL
64289 Shihwingching	2001 UA_{11}	Shihwingching	October 22, 2001	Desert Eagle	W. K. Y. Yeung	·	3.5 km	MPC · JPL
64290 Yaushingtung	2001 UD_{11}	Yaushingtung	October 22, 2001	Desert Eagle	W. K. Y. Yeung	·	5.2 km	MPC · JPL
64291 Anglee	2001 UX_{11}	Anglee	October 23, 2001	Desert Eagle	W. K. Y. Yeung	·	3.9 km	MPC · JPL
64292	2001 UF_{13}	—	October 24, 2001	Desert Eagle	W. K. Y. Yeung	·	4.9 km	MPC · JPL
64293	2001 UK_{13}	—	October 24, 2001	Desert Eagle	W. K. Y. Yeung	·	2.7 km	MPC · JPL
64294	2001 UO_{13}	—	October 24, 2001	Desert Eagle	W. K. Y. Yeung	·	6.3 km	MPC · JPL
64295 Tangtisheng	2001 UW_{13}	Tangtisheng	October 24, 2001	Desert Eagle	W. K. Y. Yeung	·	2.1 km	MPC · JPL
64296 Hokoon	2001 UB_{14}	Hokoon	October 24, 2001	Desert Eagle	W. K. Y. Yeung	V	2.3 km	MPC · JPL
64297	2001 UD_{14}	—	October 17, 2001	Bergisch Gladbach	W. Bickel	V	1.5 km	MPC · JPL
64298	2001 UE_{15}	—	October 24, 2001	Desert Eagle	W. K. Y. Yeung	·	3.0 km	MPC · JPL
64299	2001 UF_{15}	—	October 24, 2001	Desert Eagle	W. K. Y. Yeung	·	2.6 km	MPC · JPL
64300	2001 UH_{16}	—	October 25, 2001	Desert Eagle	W. K. Y. Yeung	·	4.1 km	MPC · JPL

== 64301–64400 ==
back to top

Designation			Discovery			Properties		Ref
Permanent	Provisional	Named after	Date	Site	Discoverer(s)	Category	Diam.	Ref
64301	2001 UN_{19}	—	October 16, 2001	Palomar	NEAT	·	1.7 km	MPC · JPL
64302	2001 UH_{22}	—	October 17, 2001	Socorro	LINEAR	EOS	5.3 km	MPC · JPL
64303	2001 UF_{23}	—	October 18, 2001	Socorro	LINEAR	·	5.3 km	MPC · JPL
64304	2001 UR_{23}	—	October 18, 2001	Socorro	LINEAR	MAR	3.4 km	MPC · JPL
64305	2001 UD_{27}	—	October 16, 2001	Haleakala	NEAT	·	2.6 km	MPC · JPL
64306	2001 UH_{29}	—	October 16, 2001	Socorro	LINEAR	·	8.0 km	MPC · JPL
64307	2001 UQ_{29}	—	October 16, 2001	Socorro	LINEAR	·	9.4 km	MPC · JPL
64308	2001 UJ_{30}	—	October 16, 2001	Socorro	LINEAR	·	1.8 km	MPC · JPL
64309	2001 UM_{30}	—	October 16, 2001	Socorro	LINEAR	EOS	5.5 km	MPC · JPL
64310	2001 UB_{32}	—	October 16, 2001	Socorro	LINEAR	·	1.3 km	MPC · JPL
64311	2001 UQ_{32}	—	October 16, 2001	Socorro	LINEAR	·	2.1 km	MPC · JPL
64312	2001 UY_{32}	—	October 16, 2001	Socorro	LINEAR	·	1.3 km	MPC · JPL
64313	2001 UW_{33}	—	October 16, 2001	Socorro	LINEAR	·	3.3 km	MPC · JPL
64314	2001 UL_{34}	—	October 16, 2001	Socorro	LINEAR	·	3.7 km	MPC · JPL
64315	2001 UN_{34}	—	October 16, 2001	Socorro	LINEAR	PHO	2.2 km	MPC · JPL
64316	2001 UT_{34}	—	October 16, 2001	Socorro	LINEAR	·	1.6 km	MPC · JPL
64317	2001 UW_{35}	—	October 16, 2001	Socorro	LINEAR	fast	4.6 km	MPC · JPL
64318	2001 UH_{36}	—	October 16, 2001	Socorro	LINEAR	V	1.4 km	MPC · JPL
64319	2001 UV_{37}	—	October 17, 2001	Socorro	LINEAR	·	2.1 km	MPC · JPL
64320	2001 UK_{39}	—	October 17, 2001	Socorro	LINEAR	·	2.8 km	MPC · JPL
64321	2001 UA_{40}	—	October 17, 2001	Socorro	LINEAR	(5)	2.6 km	MPC · JPL
64322	2001 UO_{41}	—	October 17, 2001	Socorro	LINEAR	·	1.9 km	MPC · JPL
64323	2001 UW_{41}	—	October 17, 2001	Socorro	LINEAR	·	1.5 km	MPC · JPL
64324	2001 UG_{42}	—	October 17, 2001	Socorro	LINEAR	·	3.7 km	MPC · JPL
64325	2001 UH_{46}	—	October 17, 2001	Socorro	LINEAR	·	1.9 km	MPC · JPL
64326	2001 UX_{46}	—	October 17, 2001	Socorro	LINEAR	L5	15 km	MPC · JPL
64327	2001 UG_{47}	—	October 17, 2001	Socorro	LINEAR	KOR	3.3 km	MPC · JPL
64328	2001 UH_{48}	—	October 17, 2001	Socorro	LINEAR	(5)	2.8 km	MPC · JPL
64329	2001 UH_{51}	—	October 17, 2001	Socorro	LINEAR	·	4.2 km	MPC · JPL
64330	2001 UM_{51}	—	October 17, 2001	Socorro	LINEAR	·	4.0 km	MPC · JPL
64331	2001 UW_{52}	—	October 17, 2001	Socorro	LINEAR	V	1.6 km	MPC · JPL
64332	2001 UL_{56}	—	October 17, 2001	Socorro	LINEAR	·	3.0 km	MPC · JPL
64333	2001 UT_{58}	—	October 17, 2001	Socorro	LINEAR	·	3.9 km	MPC · JPL
64334	2001 UK_{59}	—	October 17, 2001	Socorro	LINEAR	MAS	1.6 km	MPC · JPL
64335	2001 UL_{62}	—	October 17, 2001	Socorro	LINEAR	·	1.6 km	MPC · JPL
64336	2001 UO_{62}	—	October 17, 2001	Socorro	LINEAR	·	7.7 km	MPC · JPL
64337	2001 UM_{63}	—	October 17, 2001	Socorro	LINEAR	·	2.2 km	MPC · JPL
64338	2001 UU_{64}	—	October 18, 2001	Socorro	LINEAR	moon	2.4 km	MPC · JPL
64339	2001 US_{72}	—	October 20, 2001	Haleakala	NEAT	·	5.2 km	MPC · JPL
64340	2001 UW_{72}	—	October 16, 2001	Socorro	LINEAR	·	3.0 km	MPC · JPL
64341	2001 UX_{72}	—	October 16, 2001	Socorro	LINEAR	·	1.5 km	MPC · JPL
64342	2001 UB_{76}	—	October 17, 2001	Socorro	LINEAR	·	1.6 km	MPC · JPL
64343	2001 UH_{76}	—	October 17, 2001	Socorro	LINEAR	·	4.4 km	MPC · JPL
64344	2001 UP_{76}	—	October 17, 2001	Socorro	LINEAR	MIS	6.0 km	MPC · JPL
64345	2001 UY_{77}	—	October 18, 2001	Socorro	LINEAR	·	4.3 km	MPC · JPL
64346	2001 US_{78}	—	October 20, 2001	Socorro	LINEAR	·	1.2 km	MPC · JPL
64347	2001 UT_{78}	—	October 20, 2001	Socorro	LINEAR	·	2.9 km	MPC · JPL
64348	2001 UL_{79}	—	October 20, 2001	Socorro	LINEAR	·	7.0 km	MPC · JPL
64349	2001 UC_{80}	—	October 20, 2001	Socorro	LINEAR	·	3.8 km	MPC · JPL
64350	2001 UV_{81}	—	October 20, 2001	Socorro	LINEAR	·	3.5 km	MPC · JPL
64351	2001 UU_{83}	—	October 20, 2001	Socorro	LINEAR	·	2.5 km	MPC · JPL
64352	2001 UX_{83}	—	October 20, 2001	Socorro	LINEAR	·	2.7 km	MPC · JPL
64353	2001 UY_{83}	—	October 20, 2001	Socorro	LINEAR	·	5.9 km	MPC · JPL
64354	2001 UB_{84}	—	October 20, 2001	Socorro	LINEAR	·	5.4 km	MPC · JPL
64355	2001 UY_{84}	—	October 21, 2001	Socorro	LINEAR	·	2.0 km	MPC · JPL
64356	2001 UZ_{86}	—	October 18, 2001	Kitt Peak	Spacewatch	KOR	3.1 km	MPC · JPL
64357	2001 UJ_{89}	—	October 22, 2001	Palomar	NEAT	·	4.3 km	MPC · JPL
64358	2001 UR_{92}	—	October 18, 2001	Palomar	NEAT	·	3.8 km	MPC · JPL
64359	2001 UJ_{93}	—	October 19, 2001	Haleakala	NEAT	PHO	3.3 km	MPC · JPL
64360	2001 UD_{97}	—	October 17, 2001	Socorro	LINEAR	·	1.8 km	MPC · JPL
64361	2001 UK_{98}	—	October 17, 2001	Socorro	LINEAR	·	3.0 km	MPC · JPL
64362	2001 UD_{99}	—	October 17, 2001	Socorro	LINEAR	·	2.0 km	MPC · JPL
64363	2001 UV_{99}	—	October 17, 2001	Socorro	LINEAR	·	1.4 km	MPC · JPL
64364	2001 UY_{100}	—	October 20, 2001	Socorro	LINEAR	NYS	2.0 km	MPC · JPL
64365	2001 UG_{103}	—	October 20, 2001	Socorro	LINEAR	·	2.7 km	MPC · JPL
64366	2001 UK_{107}	—	October 20, 2001	Socorro	LINEAR	·	3.7 km	MPC · JPL
64367	2001 UC_{109}	—	October 20, 2001	Socorro	LINEAR	·	4.8 km	MPC · JPL
64368	2001 UX_{109}	—	October 20, 2001	Socorro	LINEAR	·	3.6 km	MPC · JPL
64369	2001 UW_{110}	—	October 21, 2001	Socorro	LINEAR	MAS	980 m	MPC · JPL
64370	2001 UD_{112}	—	October 21, 2001	Socorro	LINEAR	·	3.8 km	MPC · JPL
64371	2001 UH_{112}	—	October 21, 2001	Socorro	LINEAR	KOR ·	5.0 km	MPC · JPL
64372	2001 UQ_{113}	—	October 22, 2001	Socorro	LINEAR	·	3.4 km	MPC · JPL
64373	2001 UX_{113}	—	October 22, 2001	Socorro	LINEAR	·	4.9 km	MPC · JPL
64374	2001 UO_{115}	—	October 22, 2001	Socorro	LINEAR	SUL	4.0 km	MPC · JPL
64375	2001 UF_{116}	—	October 22, 2001	Socorro	LINEAR	KOR	2.9 km	MPC · JPL
64376	2001 UR_{116}	—	October 22, 2001	Socorro	LINEAR	·	2.5 km	MPC · JPL
64377	2001 UT_{116}	—	October 22, 2001	Socorro	LINEAR	·	1.8 km	MPC · JPL
64378	2001 UE_{122}	—	October 22, 2001	Socorro	LINEAR	·	4.2 km	MPC · JPL
64379	2001 UG_{123}	—	October 22, 2001	Socorro	LINEAR	·	5.0 km	MPC · JPL
64380	2001 UN_{127}	—	October 17, 2001	Socorro	LINEAR	·	1.9 km	MPC · JPL
64381	2001 UL_{129}	—	October 20, 2001	Socorro	LINEAR	·	1.8 km	MPC · JPL
64382	2001 UC_{130}	—	October 20, 2001	Socorro	LINEAR	·	3.3 km	MPC · JPL
64383	2001 UY_{130}	—	October 20, 2001	Socorro	LINEAR	NYS	2.1 km	MPC · JPL
64384	2001 UA_{132}	—	October 20, 2001	Socorro	LINEAR	·	2.7 km	MPC · JPL
64385	2001 UM_{136}	—	October 22, 2001	Socorro	LINEAR	·	3.6 km	MPC · JPL
64386	2001 UO_{141}	—	October 23, 2001	Socorro	LINEAR	·	3.5 km	MPC · JPL
64387	2001 UW_{144}	—	October 23, 2001	Socorro	LINEAR	MAS	2.0 km	MPC · JPL
64388	2001 UD_{148}	—	October 23, 2001	Socorro	LINEAR	V	1.1 km	MPC · JPL
64389	2001 UU_{149}	—	October 23, 2001	Socorro	LINEAR	·	1.7 km	MPC · JPL
64390	2001 UY_{149}	—	October 23, 2001	Socorro	LINEAR	3:2	6.6 km	MPC · JPL
64391	2001 UF_{150}	—	October 23, 2001	Socorro	LINEAR	·	1.7 km	MPC · JPL
64392	2001 UL_{150}	—	October 23, 2001	Socorro	LINEAR	·	3.0 km	MPC · JPL
64393	2001 UV_{151}	—	October 23, 2001	Socorro	LINEAR	V	1.7 km	MPC · JPL
64394	2001 UN_{152}	—	October 23, 2001	Socorro	LINEAR	NYS	2.8 km	MPC · JPL
64395	2001 US_{152}	—	October 23, 2001	Socorro	LINEAR	·	1.8 km	MPC · JPL
64396	2001 UY_{153}	—	October 23, 2001	Socorro	LINEAR	·	2.3 km	MPC · JPL
64397	2001 UK_{154}	—	October 23, 2001	Socorro	LINEAR	·	4.3 km	MPC · JPL
64398	2001 US_{154}	—	October 23, 2001	Socorro	LINEAR	·	6.4 km	MPC · JPL
64399	2001 UT_{156}	—	October 23, 2001	Socorro	LINEAR	·	2.1 km	MPC · JPL
64400	2001 UB_{158}	—	October 23, 2001	Socorro	LINEAR	MAS	1.7 km	MPC · JPL

== 64401–64500 ==
back to top

Designation			Discovery			Properties		Ref
Permanent	Provisional	Named after	Date	Site	Discoverer(s)	Category	Diam.	Ref
64401	2001 UJ_{158}	—	October 23, 2001	Socorro	LINEAR	·	1.7 km	MPC · JPL
64402	2001 UL_{161}	—	October 23, 2001	Socorro	LINEAR	V	1.9 km	MPC · JPL
64403	2001 US_{161}	—	October 23, 2001	Socorro	LINEAR	·	3.7 km	MPC · JPL
64404	2001 UT_{161}	—	October 23, 2001	Socorro	LINEAR	·	1.8 km	MPC · JPL
64405	2001 UZ_{161}	—	October 23, 2001	Socorro	LINEAR	NYS	2.2 km	MPC · JPL
64406	2001 UP_{162}	—	October 23, 2001	Socorro	LINEAR	·	2.2 km	MPC · JPL
64407	2001 UG_{164}	—	October 18, 2001	Palomar	NEAT	·	3.9 km	MPC · JPL
64408	2001 UM_{164}	—	October 19, 2001	Haleakala	NEAT	WIT	2.2 km	MPC · JPL
64409	2001 UV_{165}	—	October 23, 2001	Palomar	NEAT	·	10 km	MPC · JPL
64410	2001 UM_{167}	—	October 19, 2001	Socorro	LINEAR	·	2.8 km	MPC · JPL
64411	2001 UJ_{168}	—	October 19, 2001	Socorro	LINEAR	EUN	3.5 km	MPC · JPL
64412	2001 UV_{168}	—	October 19, 2001	Socorro	LINEAR	EUN	3.9 km	MPC · JPL
64413	2001 UY_{168}	—	October 19, 2001	Socorro	LINEAR	·	3.7 km	MPC · JPL
64414	2001 UJ_{171}	—	October 21, 2001	Socorro	LINEAR	·	4.2 km	MPC · JPL
64415	2001 UL_{174}	—	October 18, 2001	Palomar	NEAT	·	2.0 km	MPC · JPL
64416	2001 UU_{177}	—	October 21, 2001	Socorro	LINEAR	·	3.0 km	MPC · JPL
64417	2001 UA_{178}	—	October 23, 2001	Socorro	LINEAR	·	3.1 km	MPC · JPL
64418	2001 UE_{184}	—	October 16, 2001	Socorro	LINEAR	·	3.4 km	MPC · JPL
64419	2001 UG_{186}	—	October 17, 2001	Socorro	LINEAR	·	2.3 km	MPC · JPL
64420	2001 UY_{196}	—	October 19, 2001	Anderson Mesa	LONEOS	·	2.6 km	MPC · JPL
64421	2001 UD_{203}	—	October 19, 2001	Palomar	NEAT	HYG	5.8 km	MPC · JPL
64422	2001 UP_{206}	—	October 20, 2001	Socorro	LINEAR	EOS	4.5 km	MPC · JPL
64423	2001 UV_{217}	—	October 24, 2001	Socorro	LINEAR	·	3.0 km	MPC · JPL
64424	2001 VK_{1}	—	November 9, 2001	Palomar	NEAT	HOF	6.4 km	MPC · JPL
64425	2001 VD_{6}	—	November 9, 2001	Socorro	LINEAR	·	2.8 km	MPC · JPL
64426	2001 VL_{7}	—	November 9, 2001	Socorro	LINEAR	THM	4.0 km	MPC · JPL
64427	2001 VR_{8}	—	November 9, 2001	Socorro	LINEAR	·	3.0 km	MPC · JPL
64428	2001 VW_{8}	—	November 9, 2001	Socorro	LINEAR	·	2.2 km	MPC · JPL
64429	2001 VF_{9}	—	November 9, 2001	Socorro	LINEAR	·	6.5 km	MPC · JPL
64430	2001 VK_{9}	—	November 9, 2001	Socorro	LINEAR	·	3.4 km	MPC · JPL
64431	2001 VG_{11}	—	November 10, 2001	Socorro	LINEAR	·	5.1 km	MPC · JPL
64432	2001 VX_{14}	—	November 10, 2001	Socorro	LINEAR	·	5.7 km	MPC · JPL
64433	2001 VC_{15}	—	November 10, 2001	Socorro	LINEAR	(2076)	3.1 km	MPC · JPL
64434	2001 VN_{16}	—	November 7, 2001	Palomar	NEAT	·	5.5 km	MPC · JPL
64435	2001 VL_{18}	—	November 9, 2001	Socorro	LINEAR	·	4.8 km	MPC · JPL
64436	2001 VC_{20}	—	November 9, 2001	Socorro	LINEAR	·	1.5 km	MPC · JPL
64437	2001 VO_{20}	—	November 9, 2001	Socorro	LINEAR	NYS	1.8 km	MPC · JPL
64438	2001 VH_{21}	—	November 9, 2001	Socorro	LINEAR	·	6.8 km	MPC · JPL
64439	2001 VA_{23}	—	November 9, 2001	Socorro	LINEAR	·	3.0 km	MPC · JPL
64440	2001 VD_{23}	—	November 9, 2001	Socorro	LINEAR	MAS	1.8 km	MPC · JPL
64441	2001 VS_{23}	—	November 9, 2001	Socorro	LINEAR	·	3.3 km	MPC · JPL
64442	2001 VJ_{24}	—	November 9, 2001	Socorro	LINEAR	·	3.2 km	MPC · JPL
64443	2001 VQ_{25}	—	November 9, 2001	Socorro	LINEAR	slow	3.2 km	MPC · JPL
64444	2001 VO_{26}	—	November 9, 2001	Socorro	LINEAR	·	3.5 km	MPC · JPL
64445	2001 VS_{26}	—	November 9, 2001	Socorro	LINEAR	·	2.4 km	MPC · JPL
64446	2001 VU_{27}	—	November 9, 2001	Socorro	LINEAR	·	3.8 km	MPC · JPL
64447	2001 VH_{28}	—	November 9, 2001	Socorro	LINEAR	·	1.9 km	MPC · JPL
64448	2001 VZ_{28}	—	November 9, 2001	Socorro	LINEAR	NYS ·	4.8 km	MPC · JPL
64449	2001 VU_{29}	—	November 9, 2001	Socorro	LINEAR	KOR	3.1 km	MPC · JPL
64450	2001 VC_{30}	—	November 9, 2001	Socorro	LINEAR	(5)	3.3 km	MPC · JPL
64451	2001 VD_{30}	—	November 9, 2001	Socorro	LINEAR	·	4.4 km	MPC · JPL
64452	2001 VW_{30}	—	November 9, 2001	Socorro	LINEAR	(3460)	7.3 km	MPC · JPL
64453	2001 VE_{31}	—	November 9, 2001	Socorro	LINEAR	·	4.0 km	MPC · JPL
64454	2001 VJ_{31}	—	November 9, 2001	Socorro	LINEAR	·	4.3 km	MPC · JPL
64455	2001 VL_{32}	—	November 9, 2001	Socorro	LINEAR	·	2.1 km	MPC · JPL
64456	2001 VP_{32}	—	November 9, 2001	Socorro	LINEAR	·	2.8 km	MPC · JPL
64457	2001 VH_{34}	—	November 9, 2001	Socorro	LINEAR	·	3.6 km	MPC · JPL
64458	2001 VF_{35}	—	November 9, 2001	Socorro	LINEAR	·	2.2 km	MPC · JPL
64459	2001 VG_{35}	—	November 9, 2001	Socorro	LINEAR	V	1.8 km	MPC · JPL
64460	2001 VQ_{35}	—	November 9, 2001	Socorro	LINEAR	·	2.3 km	MPC · JPL
64461	2001 VL_{36}	—	November 9, 2001	Socorro	LINEAR	MAS	1.7 km	MPC · JPL
64462	2001 VG_{37}	—	November 9, 2001	Socorro	LINEAR	·	2.3 km	MPC · JPL
64463	2001 VY_{37}	—	November 9, 2001	Socorro	LINEAR	·	3.0 km	MPC · JPL
64464	2001 VQ_{38}	—	November 9, 2001	Socorro	LINEAR	·	2.2 km	MPC · JPL
64465	2001 VX_{40}	—	November 9, 2001	Socorro	LINEAR	·	1.9 km	MPC · JPL
64466	2001 VY_{40}	—	November 9, 2001	Socorro	LINEAR	·	2.0 km	MPC · JPL
64467	2001 VC_{41}	—	November 9, 2001	Socorro	LINEAR	·	3.7 km	MPC · JPL
64468	2001 VG_{41}	—	November 9, 2001	Socorro	LINEAR	·	4.0 km	MPC · JPL
64469	2001 VP_{41}	—	November 9, 2001	Socorro	LINEAR	·	2.9 km	MPC · JPL
64470	2001 VJ_{42}	—	November 9, 2001	Socorro	LINEAR	·	2.0 km	MPC · JPL
64471	2001 VL_{42}	—	November 9, 2001	Socorro	LINEAR	·	2.6 km	MPC · JPL
64472	2001 VE_{43}	—	November 9, 2001	Socorro	LINEAR	·	4.8 km	MPC · JPL
64473	2001 VQ_{43}	—	November 9, 2001	Socorro	LINEAR	·	3.6 km	MPC · JPL
64474	2001 VS_{43}	—	November 9, 2001	Socorro	LINEAR	·	4.4 km	MPC · JPL
64475	2001 VF_{44}	—	November 9, 2001	Socorro	LINEAR	·	2.3 km	MPC · JPL
64476	2001 VO_{44}	—	November 9, 2001	Socorro	LINEAR	NYS ·	5.0 km	MPC · JPL
64477	2001 VS_{44}	—	November 9, 2001	Socorro	LINEAR	·	5.8 km	MPC · JPL
64478	2001 VT_{44}	—	November 9, 2001	Socorro	LINEAR	V	3.0 km	MPC · JPL
64479	2001 VC_{45}	—	November 9, 2001	Socorro	LINEAR	·	4.8 km	MPC · JPL
64480	2001 VG_{45}	—	November 9, 2001	Socorro	LINEAR	MAS	2.2 km	MPC · JPL
64481	2001 VK_{47}	—	November 9, 2001	Socorro	LINEAR	·	2.7 km	MPC · JPL
64482	2001 VM_{47}	—	November 9, 2001	Socorro	LINEAR	·	3.7 km	MPC · JPL
64483	2001 VY_{48}	—	November 9, 2001	Socorro	LINEAR	RAF	3.8 km	MPC · JPL
64484	2001 VB_{49}	—	November 9, 2001	Socorro	LINEAR	·	2.4 km	MPC · JPL
64485	2001 VC_{49}	—	November 9, 2001	Socorro	LINEAR	KOR	3.2 km	MPC · JPL
64486	2001 VK_{50}	—	November 10, 2001	Socorro	LINEAR	·	1.9 km	MPC · JPL
64487	2001 VL_{50}	—	November 10, 2001	Socorro	LINEAR	·	6.7 km	MPC · JPL
64488	2001 VC_{54}	—	November 10, 2001	Socorro	LINEAR	·	1.8 km	MPC · JPL
64489	2001 VQ_{55}	—	November 10, 2001	Socorro	LINEAR	·	7.4 km	MPC · JPL
64490	2001 VY_{57}	—	November 10, 2001	Socorro	LINEAR	·	6.5 km	MPC · JPL
64491	2001 VJ_{59}	—	November 10, 2001	Socorro	LINEAR	·	2.7 km	MPC · JPL
64492	2001 VE_{62}	—	November 10, 2001	Socorro	LINEAR	·	2.8 km	MPC · JPL
64493	2001 VL_{62}	—	November 10, 2001	Socorro	LINEAR	·	5.0 km	MPC · JPL
64494	2001 VP_{62}	—	November 10, 2001	Socorro	LINEAR	·	1.3 km	MPC · JPL
64495	2001 VB_{63}	—	November 10, 2001	Socorro	LINEAR	·	7.2 km	MPC · JPL
64496	2001 VC_{64}	—	November 10, 2001	Socorro	LINEAR	·	4.8 km	MPC · JPL
64497	2001 VF_{64}	—	November 10, 2001	Socorro	LINEAR	·	2.6 km	MPC · JPL
64498	2001 VZ_{64}	—	November 10, 2001	Socorro	LINEAR	·	3.0 km	MPC · JPL
64499	2001 VG_{65}	—	November 10, 2001	Socorro	LINEAR	DOR	4.7 km	MPC · JPL
64500	2001 VX_{65}	—	November 10, 2001	Socorro	LINEAR	·	4.1 km	MPC · JPL

== 64501–64600 ==
back to top

Designation			Discovery			Properties		Ref
Permanent	Provisional	Named after	Date	Site	Discoverer(s)	Category	Diam.	Ref
64501	2001 VZ_{65}	—	November 10, 2001	Socorro	LINEAR	·	6.1 km	MPC · JPL
64502	2001 VQ_{66}	—	November 10, 2001	Socorro	LINEAR	AGN	2.7 km	MPC · JPL
64503	2001 VJ_{70}	—	November 11, 2001	Socorro	LINEAR	·	3.9 km	MPC · JPL
64504	2001 VO_{70}	—	November 11, 2001	Socorro	LINEAR	·	3.0 km	MPC · JPL
64505	2001 VP_{75}	—	November 15, 2001	Kitt Peak	Spacewatch	MAS	1.0 km	MPC · JPL
64506	2001 VJ_{76}	—	November 12, 2001	Goodricke-Pigott	R. A. Tucker	·	5.0 km	MPC · JPL
64507	2001 VH_{77}	—	November 9, 2001	Palomar	NEAT	DOR	5.8 km	MPC · JPL
64508	2001 VR_{79}	—	November 9, 2001	Palomar	NEAT	MRX	2.5 km	MPC · JPL
64509	2001 VL_{81}	—	November 13, 2001	Haleakala	NEAT	·	3.0 km	MPC · JPL
64510	2001 VR_{81}	—	November 15, 2001	Haleakala	NEAT	·	3.6 km	MPC · JPL
64511	2001 VT_{83}	—	November 10, 2001	Socorro	LINEAR	·	1.6 km	MPC · JPL
64512	2001 VD_{85}	—	November 12, 2001	Socorro	LINEAR	NYS	2.6 km	MPC · JPL
64513	2001 VL_{85}	—	November 12, 2001	Socorro	LINEAR	·	2.6 km	MPC · JPL
64514	2001 VT_{88}	—	November 12, 2001	Anderson Mesa	LONEOS	EUN	2.5 km	MPC · JPL
64515	2001 VE_{93}	—	November 15, 2001	Socorro	LINEAR	·	2.8 km	MPC · JPL
64516	2001 VD_{94}	—	November 15, 2001	Socorro	LINEAR	·	3.6 km	MPC · JPL
64517	2001 VH_{94}	—	November 15, 2001	Socorro	LINEAR	·	4.4 km	MPC · JPL
64518	2001 VK_{94}	—	November 15, 2001	Socorro	LINEAR	·	11 km	MPC · JPL
64519	2001 VQ_{96}	—	November 15, 2001	Socorro	LINEAR	PHO	1.9 km	MPC · JPL
64520	2001 VF_{98}	—	November 15, 2001	Socorro	LINEAR	MAR	3.7 km	MPC · JPL
64521	2001 VG_{98}	—	November 15, 2001	Socorro	LINEAR	·	2.9 km	MPC · JPL
64522	2001 VJ_{98}	—	November 15, 2001	Socorro	LINEAR	EUN · slow	4.2 km	MPC · JPL
64523	2001 VA_{99}	—	November 15, 2001	Socorro	LINEAR	(194)	6.8 km	MPC · JPL
64524	2001 VB_{100}	—	November 15, 2001	Socorro	LINEAR	PHO	3.2 km	MPC · JPL
64525	2001 VU_{101}	—	November 12, 2001	Socorro	LINEAR	·	3.4 km	MPC · JPL
64526	2001 VE_{104}	—	November 12, 2001	Socorro	LINEAR	·	1.7 km	MPC · JPL
64527	2001 VF_{105}	—	November 12, 2001	Socorro	LINEAR	·	4.3 km	MPC · JPL
64528	2001 VZ_{105}	—	November 12, 2001	Socorro	LINEAR	·	2.0 km	MPC · JPL
64529	2001 VV_{107}	—	November 12, 2001	Socorro	LINEAR	·	1.9 km	MPC · JPL
64530	2001 VF_{110}	—	November 12, 2001	Socorro	LINEAR	·	2.4 km	MPC · JPL
64531	2001 VE_{111}	—	November 12, 2001	Socorro	LINEAR	·	2.7 km	MPC · JPL
64532	2001 VB_{114}	—	November 12, 2001	Socorro	LINEAR	HYG	5.4 km	MPC · JPL
64533	2001 VR_{116}	—	November 12, 2001	Socorro	LINEAR	THM	4.1 km	MPC · JPL
64534	2001 VE_{117}	—	November 12, 2001	Socorro	LINEAR	·	1.6 km	MPC · JPL
64535	2001 VF_{117}	—	November 12, 2001	Socorro	LINEAR	·	6.0 km	MPC · JPL
64536	2001 VV_{117}	—	November 12, 2001	Socorro	LINEAR	·	2.4 km	MPC · JPL
64537	2001 VZ_{117}	—	November 12, 2001	Socorro	LINEAR	·	1.9 km	MPC · JPL
64538	2001 VF_{118}	—	November 12, 2001	Socorro	LINEAR	·	1.7 km	MPC · JPL
64539	2001 VJ_{118}	—	November 12, 2001	Socorro	LINEAR	·	5.8 km	MPC · JPL
64540	2001 VR_{118}	—	November 12, 2001	Socorro	LINEAR	HYG	5.8 km	MPC · JPL
64541	2001 VZ_{118}	—	November 12, 2001	Socorro	LINEAR	·	3.3 km	MPC · JPL
64542	2001 VB_{120}	—	November 12, 2001	Socorro	LINEAR	·	4.4 km	MPC · JPL
64543	2001 VK_{120}	—	November 12, 2001	Socorro	LINEAR	·	4.6 km	MPC · JPL
64544	2001 VD_{121}	—	November 15, 2001	Socorro	LINEAR	slow	7.2 km	MPC · JPL
64545	2001 VB_{122}	—	November 13, 2001	Haleakala	NEAT	·	5.8 km	MPC · JPL
64546	2001 VJ_{122}	—	November 13, 2001	Haleakala	NEAT	PHO	2.5 km	MPC · JPL
64547 Saku	2001 WF	Saku	November 16, 2001	Bisei SG Center	BATTeRS	·	3.8 km	MPC · JPL
64548	2001 WK_{1}	—	November 17, 2001	Kitt Peak	Spacewatch	·	2.1 km	MPC · JPL
64549	2001 WO_{1}	—	November 18, 2001	Bisei SG Center	BATTeRS	·	1.4 km	MPC · JPL
64550	2001 WJ_{7}	—	November 17, 2001	Socorro	LINEAR	NYS	1.7 km	MPC · JPL
64551	2001 WO_{9}	—	November 17, 2001	Socorro	LINEAR	·	2.0 km	MPC · JPL
64552	2001 WE_{15}	—	November 17, 2001	Anderson Mesa	LONEOS	EUN	6.3 km	MPC · JPL
64553 Segorbe	2001 WR_{15}	Segorbe	November 24, 2001	Pla D'Arguines	R. Ferrando	·	2.6 km	MPC · JPL
64554	2001 WG_{17}	—	November 17, 2001	Socorro	LINEAR	·	2.8 km	MPC · JPL
64555	2001 WA_{22}	—	November 18, 2001	Socorro	LINEAR	EUN · slow	2.5 km	MPC · JPL
64556	2001 WB_{22}	—	November 18, 2001	Socorro	LINEAR	·	3.3 km	MPC · JPL
64557	2001 WU_{25}	—	November 17, 2001	Socorro	LINEAR	·	1.2 km	MPC · JPL
64558	2001 WH_{27}	—	November 17, 2001	Socorro	LINEAR	·	2.9 km	MPC · JPL
64559	2001 WU_{28}	—	November 17, 2001	Socorro	LINEAR	·	3.5 km	MPC · JPL
64560	2001 WB_{30}	—	November 17, 2001	Socorro	LINEAR	·	4.0 km	MPC · JPL
64561	2001 WT_{31}	—	November 17, 2001	Socorro	LINEAR	RAF	1.4 km	MPC · JPL
64562	2001 WX_{32}	—	November 17, 2001	Socorro	LINEAR	EOS	4.3 km	MPC · JPL
64563	2001 WL_{35}	—	November 17, 2001	Socorro	LINEAR	·	4.0 km	MPC · JPL
64564	2001 WN_{35}	—	November 17, 2001	Socorro	LINEAR	·	5.4 km	MPC · JPL
64565	2001 WA_{36}	—	November 17, 2001	Socorro	LINEAR	·	2.9 km	MPC · JPL
64566	2001 WD_{36}	—	November 17, 2001	Socorro	LINEAR	V	2.3 km	MPC · JPL
64567	2001 WB_{37}	—	November 17, 2001	Socorro	LINEAR	·	3.5 km	MPC · JPL
64568	2001 WK_{38}	—	November 17, 2001	Socorro	LINEAR	DOR	4.0 km	MPC · JPL
64569	2001 WO_{38}	—	November 17, 2001	Socorro	LINEAR	·	1.8 km	MPC · JPL
64570	2001 WS_{38}	—	November 17, 2001	Socorro	LINEAR	·	1.6 km	MPC · JPL
64571	2001 WT_{38}	—	November 17, 2001	Socorro	LINEAR	·	2.9 km	MPC · JPL
64572	2001 WA_{39}	—	November 17, 2001	Socorro	LINEAR	(5)	3.3 km	MPC · JPL
64573	2001 WC_{40}	—	November 17, 2001	Socorro	LINEAR	·	1.7 km	MPC · JPL
64574	2001 WD_{40}	—	November 17, 2001	Socorro	LINEAR	·	2.5 km	MPC · JPL
64575	2001 WM_{40}	—	November 17, 2001	Socorro	LINEAR	·	2.9 km	MPC · JPL
64576	2001 WG_{41}	—	November 17, 2001	Socorro	LINEAR	·	1.8 km	MPC · JPL
64577	2001 WQ_{41}	—	November 17, 2001	Socorro	LINEAR	H	3.3 km	MPC · JPL
64578	2001 WR_{44}	—	November 18, 2001	Socorro	LINEAR	SUL	4.2 km	MPC · JPL
64579	2001 WG_{47}	—	November 16, 2001	Palomar	NEAT	·	5.1 km	MPC · JPL
64580	2001 WN_{50}	—	November 17, 2001	Socorro	LINEAR	THM	4.7 km	MPC · JPL
64581	2001 WN_{64}	—	November 19, 2001	Socorro	LINEAR	·	3.6 km	MPC · JPL
64582	2001 WJ_{67}	—	November 20, 2001	Socorro	LINEAR	·	2.5 km	MPC · JPL
64583	2001 WS_{84}	—	November 20, 2001	Socorro	LINEAR	·	2.4 km	MPC · JPL
64584	2001 WW_{88}	—	November 19, 2001	Socorro	LINEAR	·	3.4 km	MPC · JPL
64585	2001 WW_{91}	—	November 21, 2001	Socorro	LINEAR	·	1.5 km	MPC · JPL
64586	2001 WJ_{94}	—	November 20, 2001	Socorro	LINEAR	·	2.2 km	MPC · JPL
64587	2001 XA	—	December 1, 2001	Ametlla de Mar	J. Nomen	·	5.6 km	MPC · JPL
64588	2001 XX_{3}	—	December 9, 2001	Socorro	LINEAR	PHO	5.5 km	MPC · JPL
64589	2001 XN_{7}	—	December 7, 2001	Socorro	LINEAR	·	4.1 km	MPC · JPL
64590	2001 XR_{7}	—	December 8, 2001	Socorro	LINEAR	·	6.6 km	MPC · JPL
64591	2001 XW_{7}	—	December 8, 2001	Socorro	LINEAR	·	4.1 km	MPC · JPL
64592	2001 XG_{8}	—	December 8, 2001	Socorro	LINEAR	EUN	3.9 km	MPC · JPL
64593	2001 XN_{8}	—	December 9, 2001	Socorro	LINEAR	·	4.5 km	MPC · JPL
64594	2001 XO_{8}	—	December 9, 2001	Socorro	LINEAR	·	2.5 km	MPC · JPL
64595	2001 XO_{14}	—	December 9, 2001	Socorro	LINEAR	EOS	4.1 km	MPC · JPL
64596	2001 XC_{16}	—	December 10, 2001	Socorro	LINEAR	·	1.6 km	MPC · JPL
64597	2001 XF_{17}	—	December 9, 2001	Socorro	LINEAR	·	2.7 km	MPC · JPL
64598	2001 XN_{17}	—	December 9, 2001	Socorro	LINEAR	EUN	3.9 km	MPC · JPL
64599	2001 XD_{19}	—	December 9, 2001	Socorro	LINEAR	V	2.3 km	MPC · JPL
64600	2001 XM_{20}	—	December 9, 2001	Socorro	LINEAR	·	2.2 km	MPC · JPL

== 64601–64700 ==
back to top

Designation			Discovery			Properties		Ref
Permanent	Provisional	Named after	Date	Site	Discoverer(s)	Category	Diam.	Ref
64601	2001 XW_{20}	—	December 9, 2001	Socorro	LINEAR	·	5.8 km	MPC · JPL
64602	2001 XE_{21}	—	December 9, 2001	Socorro	LINEAR	·	3.9 km	MPC · JPL
64603	2001 XC_{22}	—	December 9, 2001	Socorro	LINEAR	·	1.8 km	MPC · JPL
64604	2001 XM_{22}	—	December 9, 2001	Socorro	LINEAR	·	4.7 km	MPC · JPL
64605	2001 XD_{23}	—	December 9, 2001	Socorro	LINEAR	·	3.4 km	MPC · JPL
64606	2001 XF_{23}	—	December 9, 2001	Socorro	LINEAR	·	2.4 km	MPC · JPL
64607	2001 XG_{23}	—	December 9, 2001	Socorro	LINEAR	·	3.7 km	MPC · JPL
64608	2001 XK_{23}	—	December 9, 2001	Socorro	LINEAR	·	4.2 km	MPC · JPL
64609	2001 XQ_{24}	—	December 10, 2001	Socorro	LINEAR	·	3.0 km	MPC · JPL
64610	2001 XD_{25}	—	December 10, 2001	Socorro	LINEAR	·	2.6 km	MPC · JPL
64611	2001 XA_{26}	—	December 10, 2001	Socorro	LINEAR	·	4.2 km	MPC · JPL
64612	2001 XH_{26}	—	December 10, 2001	Socorro	LINEAR	·	5.6 km	MPC · JPL
64613	2001 XP_{26}	—	December 10, 2001	Socorro	LINEAR	·	3.2 km	MPC · JPL
64614	2001 XW_{26}	—	December 10, 2001	Socorro	LINEAR	·	2.4 km	MPC · JPL
64615	2001 XW_{27}	—	December 10, 2001	Socorro	LINEAR	·	3.2 km	MPC · JPL
64616	2001 XO_{28}	—	December 11, 2001	Socorro	LINEAR	V	1.8 km	MPC · JPL
64617	2001 XP_{28}	—	December 11, 2001	Socorro	LINEAR	·	2.3 km	MPC · JPL
64618	2001 XQ_{28}	—	December 11, 2001	Socorro	LINEAR	BAP	2.6 km	MPC · JPL
64619	2001 XR_{28}	—	December 11, 2001	Socorro	LINEAR	·	2.7 km	MPC · JPL
64620	2001 XJ_{29}	—	December 11, 2001	Socorro	LINEAR	·	3.4 km	MPC · JPL
64621	2001 XE_{30}	—	December 11, 2001	Socorro	LINEAR	EUN	4.1 km	MPC · JPL
64622	2001 XO_{31}	—	December 14, 2001	Oaxaca	Roe, J. M.	MIS	6.4 km	MPC · JPL
64623	2001 XU_{35}	—	December 9, 2001	Socorro	LINEAR	EUN	3.0 km	MPC · JPL
64624	2001 XZ_{36}	—	December 9, 2001	Socorro	LINEAR	ADE	6.0 km	MPC · JPL
64625	2001 XM_{41}	—	December 9, 2001	Socorro	LINEAR	·	3.7 km	MPC · JPL
64626	2001 XQ_{42}	—	December 9, 2001	Socorro	LINEAR	·	1.8 km	MPC · JPL
64627	2001 XD_{43}	—	December 9, 2001	Socorro	LINEAR	·	4.1 km	MPC · JPL
64628	2001 XJ_{44}	—	December 9, 2001	Socorro	LINEAR	·	7.7 km	MPC · JPL
64629	2001 XS_{45}	—	December 9, 2001	Socorro	LINEAR	·	4.4 km	MPC · JPL
64630	2001 XT_{45}	—	December 9, 2001	Socorro	LINEAR	·	4.4 km	MPC · JPL
64631	2001 XD_{46}	—	December 9, 2001	Socorro	LINEAR	EMA	7.9 km	MPC · JPL
64632	2001 XT_{46}	—	December 9, 2001	Socorro	LINEAR	·	9.3 km	MPC · JPL
64633	2001 XC_{48}	—	December 9, 2001	Socorro	LINEAR	·	4.9 km	MPC · JPL
64634	2001 XU_{49}	—	December 10, 2001	Socorro	LINEAR	·	1.5 km	MPC · JPL
64635	2001 XH_{50}	—	December 10, 2001	Socorro	LINEAR	KOR	2.7 km	MPC · JPL
64636	2001 XR_{50}	—	December 11, 2001	Socorro	LINEAR	·	5.6 km	MPC · JPL
64637	2001 XM_{51}	—	December 10, 2001	Socorro	LINEAR	·	4.3 km	MPC · JPL
64638	2001 XT_{51}	—	December 11, 2001	Socorro	LINEAR	V	1.7 km	MPC · JPL
64639	2001 XZ_{51}	—	December 10, 2001	Socorro	LINEAR	·	4.2 km	MPC · JPL
64640	2001 XB_{52}	—	December 10, 2001	Socorro	LINEAR	·	4.6 km	MPC · JPL
64641	2001 XC_{52}	—	December 10, 2001	Socorro	LINEAR	·	2.7 km	MPC · JPL
64642	2001 XK_{52}	—	December 10, 2001	Socorro	LINEAR	THM	6.3 km	MPC · JPL
64643	2001 XW_{52}	—	December 10, 2001	Socorro	LINEAR	V	2.2 km	MPC · JPL
64644	2001 XE_{53}	—	December 10, 2001	Socorro	LINEAR	·	4.1 km	MPC · JPL
64645	2001 XM_{53}	—	December 10, 2001	Socorro	LINEAR	·	1.8 km	MPC · JPL
64646	2001 XN_{53}	—	December 10, 2001	Socorro	LINEAR	·	4.6 km	MPC · JPL
64647	2001 XQ_{54}	—	December 10, 2001	Socorro	LINEAR	·	4.2 km	MPC · JPL
64648	2001 XD_{55}	—	December 10, 2001	Socorro	LINEAR	NYS ·	4.0 km	MPC · JPL
64649	2001 XS_{55}	—	December 10, 2001	Socorro	LINEAR	·	4.8 km	MPC · JPL
64650	2001 XT_{55}	—	December 10, 2001	Socorro	LINEAR	·	2.5 km	MPC · JPL
64651	2001 XS_{56}	—	December 11, 2001	Socorro	LINEAR	·	6.0 km	MPC · JPL
64652	2001 XF_{57}	—	December 10, 2001	Socorro	LINEAR	·	3.2 km	MPC · JPL
64653	2001 XM_{57}	—	December 11, 2001	Socorro	LINEAR	GEF	3.6 km	MPC · JPL
64654	2001 XH_{58}	—	December 10, 2001	Socorro	LINEAR	THM	6.0 km	MPC · JPL
64655	2001 XG_{59}	—	December 10, 2001	Socorro	LINEAR	·	2.9 km	MPC · JPL
64656	2001 XL_{59}	—	December 10, 2001	Socorro	LINEAR	·	2.3 km	MPC · JPL
64657	2001 XP_{59}	—	December 10, 2001	Socorro	LINEAR	(5)	2.5 km	MPC · JPL
64658	2001 XR_{59}	—	December 10, 2001	Socorro	LINEAR	·	4.2 km	MPC · JPL
64659	2001 XW_{59}	—	December 10, 2001	Socorro	LINEAR	NYS ·	5.1 km	MPC · JPL
64660	2001 XH_{60}	—	December 10, 2001	Socorro	LINEAR	·	3.0 km	MPC · JPL
64661	2001 XJ_{60}	—	December 10, 2001	Socorro	LINEAR	·	7.1 km	MPC · JPL
64662	2001 XQ_{60}	—	December 10, 2001	Socorro	LINEAR	MAS	2.0 km	MPC · JPL
64663	2001 XU_{60}	—	December 10, 2001	Socorro	LINEAR	·	1.9 km	MPC · JPL
64664	2001 XL_{61}	—	December 10, 2001	Socorro	LINEAR	·	5.1 km	MPC · JPL
64665	2001 XD_{62}	—	December 10, 2001	Socorro	LINEAR	·	3.4 km	MPC · JPL
64666	2001 XU_{62}	—	December 10, 2001	Socorro	LINEAR	·	2.3 km	MPC · JPL
64667	2001 XM_{63}	—	December 10, 2001	Socorro	LINEAR	·	4.3 km	MPC · JPL
64668	2001 XR_{63}	—	December 10, 2001	Socorro	LINEAR	·	2.0 km	MPC · JPL
64669	2001 XV_{63}	—	December 10, 2001	Socorro	LINEAR	NYS	4.5 km	MPC · JPL
64670	2001 XJ_{64}	—	December 10, 2001	Socorro	LINEAR	·	2.0 km	MPC · JPL
64671	2001 XX_{64}	—	December 10, 2001	Socorro	LINEAR	·	3.7 km	MPC · JPL
64672	2001 XS_{65}	—	December 10, 2001	Socorro	LINEAR	·	2.2 km	MPC · JPL
64673	2001 XD_{66}	—	December 10, 2001	Socorro	LINEAR	·	2.1 km	MPC · JPL
64674	2001 XH_{66}	—	December 10, 2001	Socorro	LINEAR	·	2.9 km	MPC · JPL
64675	2001 XL_{67}	—	December 10, 2001	Socorro	LINEAR	·	4.7 km	MPC · JPL
64676	2001 XE_{68}	—	December 10, 2001	Socorro	LINEAR	·	5.6 km	MPC · JPL
64677	2001 XG_{68}	—	December 10, 2001	Socorro	LINEAR	·	7.6 km	MPC · JPL
64678	2001 XQ_{68}	—	December 11, 2001	Socorro	LINEAR	EUN · slow	3.7 km	MPC · JPL
64679	2001 XU_{68}	—	December 11, 2001	Socorro	LINEAR	·	3.2 km	MPC · JPL
64680	2001 XJ_{70}	—	December 11, 2001	Socorro	LINEAR	EUN	2.5 km	MPC · JPL
64681	2001 XF_{71}	—	December 11, 2001	Socorro	LINEAR	KOR	2.6 km	MPC · JPL
64682	2001 XM_{71}	—	December 11, 2001	Socorro	LINEAR	·	5.2 km	MPC · JPL
64683	2001 XA_{72}	—	December 11, 2001	Socorro	LINEAR	·	8.1 km	MPC · JPL
64684	2001 XB_{72}	—	December 11, 2001	Socorro	LINEAR	·	6.1 km	MPC · JPL
64685	2001 XP_{72}	—	December 11, 2001	Socorro	LINEAR	V	2.4 km	MPC · JPL
64686	2001 XS_{72}	—	December 11, 2001	Socorro	LINEAR	V	1.6 km	MPC · JPL
64687	2001 XC_{74}	—	December 11, 2001	Socorro	LINEAR	·	1.9 km	MPC · JPL
64688	2001 XC_{77}	—	December 11, 2001	Socorro	LINEAR	·	7.2 km	MPC · JPL
64689	2001 XD_{79}	—	December 11, 2001	Socorro	LINEAR	·	7.8 km	MPC · JPL
64690	2001 XM_{79}	—	December 11, 2001	Socorro	LINEAR	·	2.4 km	MPC · JPL
64691	2001 XM_{80}	—	December 11, 2001	Socorro	LINEAR	·	4.0 km	MPC · JPL
64692	2001 XN_{81}	—	December 11, 2001	Socorro	LINEAR	EOS	5.0 km	MPC · JPL
64693	2001 XV_{81}	—	December 11, 2001	Socorro	LINEAR	·	4.0 km	MPC · JPL
64694	2001 XL_{82}	—	December 11, 2001	Socorro	LINEAR	·	7.1 km	MPC · JPL
64695	2001 XQ_{82}	—	December 11, 2001	Socorro	LINEAR	·	2.3 km	MPC · JPL
64696	2001 XQ_{83}	—	December 11, 2001	Socorro	LINEAR	NYS	1.6 km	MPC · JPL
64697	2001 XD_{84}	—	December 11, 2001	Socorro	LINEAR	·	3.2 km	MPC · JPL
64698	2001 XY_{84}	—	December 11, 2001	Socorro	LINEAR	·	1.6 km	MPC · JPL
64699	2001 XY_{85}	—	December 11, 2001	Socorro	LINEAR	·	2.8 km	MPC · JPL
64700	2001 XA_{86}	—	December 11, 2001	Socorro	LINEAR	HYG	7.7 km	MPC · JPL

== 64701–64800 ==
back to top

Designation			Discovery			Properties		Ref
Permanent	Provisional	Named after	Date	Site	Discoverer(s)	Category	Diam.	Ref
64701	2001 XT_{86}	—	December 11, 2001	Socorro	LINEAR	·	2.6 km	MPC · JPL
64702	2001 XF_{87}	—	December 13, 2001	Socorro	LINEAR	MRX	2.4 km	MPC · JPL
64703	2001 XH_{87}	—	December 13, 2001	Socorro	LINEAR	EOS	9.8 km	MPC · JPL
64704	2001 XJ_{88}	—	December 14, 2001	Desert Eagle	W. K. Y. Yeung	ADE	7.7 km	MPC · JPL
64705	2001 XB_{90}	—	December 10, 2001	Socorro	LINEAR	·	2.8 km	MPC · JPL
64706	2001 XH_{90}	—	December 10, 2001	Socorro	LINEAR	·	2.6 km	MPC · JPL
64707	2001 XA_{91}	—	December 10, 2001	Socorro	LINEAR	·	2.8 km	MPC · JPL
64708	2001 XP_{94}	—	December 10, 2001	Socorro	LINEAR	EOS	4.2 km	MPC · JPL
64709	2001 XP_{95}	—	December 10, 2001	Socorro	LINEAR	·	3.9 km	MPC · JPL
64710	2001 XN_{96}	—	December 10, 2001	Socorro	LINEAR	MAS	1.6 km	MPC · JPL
64711	2001 XM_{98}	—	December 10, 2001	Socorro	LINEAR	·	4.5 km	MPC · JPL
64712	2001 XE_{99}	—	December 10, 2001	Socorro	LINEAR	·	4.8 km	MPC · JPL
64713	2001 XK_{99}	—	December 10, 2001	Socorro	LINEAR	·	2.0 km	MPC · JPL
64714	2001 XP_{99}	—	December 10, 2001	Socorro	LINEAR	·	3.4 km	MPC · JPL
64715	2001 XY_{99}	—	December 10, 2001	Socorro	LINEAR	·	5.0 km	MPC · JPL
64716	2001 XA_{100}	—	December 10, 2001	Socorro	LINEAR	EOS	5.4 km	MPC · JPL
64717	2001 XH_{100}	—	December 10, 2001	Socorro	LINEAR	EOS	4.5 km	MPC · JPL
64718	2001 XJ_{100}	—	December 10, 2001	Socorro	LINEAR	NYS	2.8 km	MPC · JPL
64719	2001 XA_{101}	—	December 10, 2001	Socorro	LINEAR	·	2.4 km	MPC · JPL
64720	2001 XJ_{101}	—	December 10, 2001	Socorro	LINEAR	·	3.4 km	MPC · JPL
64721	2001 XP_{101}	—	December 10, 2001	Socorro	LINEAR	·	2.2 km	MPC · JPL
64722	2001 XJ_{105}	—	December 9, 2001	Bergisch Gladbach	W. Bickel	·	6.4 km	MPC · JPL
64723	2001 XS_{105}	—	December 10, 2001	Socorro	LINEAR	HYG	4.6 km	MPC · JPL
64724	2001 XW_{105}	—	December 10, 2001	Socorro	LINEAR	·	2.1 km	MPC · JPL
64725	2001 XL_{111}	—	December 11, 2001	Socorro	LINEAR	·	4.3 km	MPC · JPL
64726	2001 XX_{112}	—	December 11, 2001	Socorro	LINEAR	·	3.0 km	MPC · JPL
64727	2001 XW_{113}	—	December 11, 2001	Socorro	LINEAR	·	2.2 km	MPC · JPL
64728	2001 XC_{115}	—	December 13, 2001	Socorro	LINEAR	·	4.0 km	MPC · JPL
64729	2001 XZ_{115}	—	December 13, 2001	Socorro	LINEAR	PHO	1.9 km	MPC · JPL
64730	2001 XL_{116}	—	December 13, 2001	Socorro	LINEAR	(2076)	3.2 km	MPC · JPL
64731	2001 XC_{118}	—	December 13, 2001	Socorro	LINEAR	VER	8.1 km	MPC · JPL
64732	2001 XJ_{121}	—	December 14, 2001	Socorro	LINEAR	·	2.3 km	MPC · JPL
64733	2001 XD_{129}	—	December 14, 2001	Socorro	LINEAR	·	5.1 km	MPC · JPL
64734	2001 XY_{130}	—	December 14, 2001	Socorro	LINEAR	·	2.6 km	MPC · JPL
64735	2001 XV_{134}	—	December 14, 2001	Socorro	LINEAR	·	1.8 km	MPC · JPL
64736	2001 XL_{137}	—	December 14, 2001	Socorro	LINEAR	·	1.5 km	MPC · JPL
64737	2001 XQ_{139}	—	December 14, 2001	Socorro	LINEAR	·	3.8 km	MPC · JPL
64738	2001 XV_{142}	—	December 14, 2001	Socorro	LINEAR	slow	2.2 km	MPC · JPL
64739	2001 XN_{144}	—	December 14, 2001	Socorro	LINEAR	3:2	8.6 km	MPC · JPL
64740	2001 XP_{144}	—	December 14, 2001	Socorro	LINEAR	·	5.5 km	MPC · JPL
64741	2001 XP_{146}	—	December 14, 2001	Socorro	LINEAR	·	1.9 km	MPC · JPL
64742	2001 XF_{147}	—	December 14, 2001	Socorro	LINEAR	·	3.1 km	MPC · JPL
64743	2001 XW_{147}	—	December 14, 2001	Socorro	LINEAR	·	2.1 km	MPC · JPL
64744	2001 XM_{148}	—	December 14, 2001	Socorro	LINEAR	·	1.8 km	MPC · JPL
64745	2001 XV_{148}	—	December 14, 2001	Socorro	LINEAR	·	3.8 km	MPC · JPL
64746	2001 XR_{151}	—	December 14, 2001	Socorro	LINEAR	·	1.8 km	MPC · JPL
64747	2001 XE_{152}	—	December 14, 2001	Socorro	LINEAR	·	5.7 km	MPC · JPL
64748	2001 XE_{153}	—	December 14, 2001	Socorro	LINEAR	·	4.5 km	MPC · JPL
64749	2001 XJ_{153}	—	December 14, 2001	Socorro	LINEAR	THM	5.7 km	MPC · JPL
64750	2001 XL_{156}	—	December 14, 2001	Socorro	LINEAR	·	3.2 km	MPC · JPL
64751	2001 XR_{156}	—	December 14, 2001	Socorro	LINEAR	NYS	2.8 km	MPC · JPL
64752	2001 XN_{157}	—	December 14, 2001	Socorro	LINEAR	·	2.1 km	MPC · JPL
64753	2001 XV_{157}	—	December 14, 2001	Socorro	LINEAR	·	4.6 km	MPC · JPL
64754	2001 XP_{158}	—	December 14, 2001	Socorro	LINEAR	KOR	3.0 km	MPC · JPL
64755	2001 XD_{159}	—	December 14, 2001	Socorro	LINEAR	·	9.0 km	MPC · JPL
64756	2001 XP_{160}	—	December 14, 2001	Socorro	LINEAR	·	3.0 km	MPC · JPL
64757	2001 XG_{162}	—	December 14, 2001	Socorro	LINEAR	·	2.7 km	MPC · JPL
64758	2001 XL_{163}	—	December 14, 2001	Socorro	LINEAR	·	5.0 km	MPC · JPL
64759	2001 XU_{167}	—	December 14, 2001	Socorro	LINEAR	HYG	5.4 km	MPC · JPL
64760	2001 XN_{168}	—	December 14, 2001	Socorro	LINEAR	·	1.8 km	MPC · JPL
64761	2001 XZ_{171}	—	December 14, 2001	Socorro	LINEAR	KOR	2.9 km	MPC · JPL
64762	2001 XD_{174}	—	December 14, 2001	Socorro	LINEAR	CYB	8.8 km	MPC · JPL
64763	2001 XV_{174}	—	December 14, 2001	Socorro	LINEAR	THM	5.7 km	MPC · JPL
64764	2001 XU_{175}	—	December 14, 2001	Socorro	LINEAR	·	4.9 km	MPC · JPL
64765	2001 XM_{176}	—	December 14, 2001	Socorro	LINEAR	·	3.4 km	MPC · JPL
64766	2001 XZ_{176}	—	December 14, 2001	Socorro	LINEAR	·	3.6 km	MPC · JPL
64767	2001 XP_{177}	—	December 14, 2001	Socorro	LINEAR	·	2.4 km	MPC · JPL
64768	2001 XK_{178}	—	December 14, 2001	Socorro	LINEAR	NYS	3.4 km	MPC · JPL
64769	2001 XO_{178}	—	December 14, 2001	Socorro	LINEAR	·	4.5 km	MPC · JPL
64770	2001 XQ_{179}	—	December 14, 2001	Socorro	LINEAR	·	1.7 km	MPC · JPL
64771	2001 XM_{180}	—	December 14, 2001	Socorro	LINEAR	ERI	6.5 km	MPC · JPL
64772	2001 XY_{180}	—	December 14, 2001	Socorro	LINEAR	·	4.6 km	MPC · JPL
64773	2001 XS_{182}	—	December 14, 2001	Socorro	LINEAR	EOS	4.5 km	MPC · JPL
64774	2001 XU_{182}	—	December 14, 2001	Socorro	LINEAR	·	8.6 km	MPC · JPL
64775	2001 XO_{184}	—	December 14, 2001	Socorro	LINEAR	NYS	2.4 km	MPC · JPL
64776	2001 XP_{188}	—	December 14, 2001	Socorro	LINEAR	·	2.7 km	MPC · JPL
64777	2001 XD_{189}	—	December 14, 2001	Socorro	LINEAR	DOR	5.6 km	MPC · JPL
64778	2001 XL_{189}	—	December 14, 2001	Socorro	LINEAR	·	2.6 km	MPC · JPL
64779	2001 XD_{190}	—	December 14, 2001	Socorro	LINEAR	·	3.5 km	MPC · JPL
64780	2001 XZ_{192}	—	December 14, 2001	Socorro	LINEAR	NYS	3.0 km	MPC · JPL
64781	2001 XG_{193}	—	December 14, 2001	Socorro	LINEAR	·	2.6 km	MPC · JPL
64782	2001 XU_{193}	—	December 14, 2001	Socorro	LINEAR	·	3.0 km	MPC · JPL
64783	2001 XL_{196}	—	December 14, 2001	Socorro	LINEAR	·	1.6 km	MPC · JPL
64784	2001 XS_{197}	—	December 14, 2001	Socorro	LINEAR	·	3.9 km	MPC · JPL
64785	2001 XW_{197}	—	December 14, 2001	Socorro	LINEAR	·	6.5 km	MPC · JPL
64786	2001 XM_{199}	—	December 14, 2001	Socorro	LINEAR	·	3.9 km	MPC · JPL
64787	2001 XH_{200}	—	December 15, 2001	Socorro	LINEAR	·	2.6 km	MPC · JPL
64788	2001 XL_{201}	—	December 14, 2001	Bergisch Gladbach	W. Bickel	·	2.5 km	MPC · JPL
64789	2001 XL_{202}	—	December 11, 2001	Socorro	LINEAR	·	2.3 km	MPC · JPL
64790	2001 XQ_{202}	—	December 11, 2001	Socorro	LINEAR	(159)	4.6 km	MPC · JPL
64791	2001 XH_{206}	—	December 11, 2001	Socorro	LINEAR	·	2.3 km	MPC · JPL
64792	2001 XL_{206}	—	December 11, 2001	Socorro	LINEAR	·	4.2 km	MPC · JPL
64793	2001 XR_{206}	—	December 11, 2001	Socorro	LINEAR	·	1.8 km	MPC · JPL
64794	2001 XY_{206}	—	December 11, 2001	Socorro	LINEAR	·	1.8 km	MPC · JPL
64795	2001 XC_{207}	—	December 11, 2001	Socorro	LINEAR	URS · slow	11 km	MPC · JPL
64796	2001 XM_{207}	—	December 11, 2001	Socorro	LINEAR	GEF	3.2 km	MPC · JPL
64797	2001 XS_{207}	—	December 11, 2001	Socorro	LINEAR	·	3.6 km	MPC · JPL
64798	2001 XA_{208}	—	December 11, 2001	Socorro	LINEAR	·	1.8 km	MPC · JPL
64799	2001 XW_{209}	—	December 11, 2001	Socorro	LINEAR	·	2.1 km	MPC · JPL
64800	2001 XA_{210}	—	December 11, 2001	Socorro	LINEAR	V	1.7 km	MPC · JPL

== 64801–64900 ==
back to top

Designation			Discovery			Properties		Ref
Permanent	Provisional	Named after	Date	Site	Discoverer(s)	Category	Diam.	Ref
64801	2001 XH_{210}	—	December 11, 2001	Socorro	LINEAR	·	1.6 km	MPC · JPL
64802	2001 XK_{210}	—	December 11, 2001	Socorro	LINEAR	·	3.4 km	MPC · JPL
64803	2001 XV_{211}	—	December 11, 2001	Socorro	LINEAR	V	1.4 km	MPC · JPL
64804	2001 XA_{212}	—	December 11, 2001	Socorro	LINEAR	·	4.8 km	MPC · JPL
64805	2001 XP_{212}	—	December 11, 2001	Socorro	LINEAR	·	2.6 km	MPC · JPL
64806	2001 XR_{212}	—	December 11, 2001	Socorro	LINEAR	·	2.0 km	MPC · JPL
64807	2001 XD_{213}	—	December 11, 2001	Socorro	LINEAR	EUN	3.8 km	MPC · JPL
64808	2001 XH_{213}	—	December 11, 2001	Socorro	LINEAR	·	1.9 km	MPC · JPL
64809	2001 XY_{213}	—	December 11, 2001	Socorro	LINEAR	MAR	3.3 km	MPC · JPL
64810	2001 XH_{216}	—	December 14, 2001	Socorro	LINEAR	·	3.0 km	MPC · JPL
64811	2001 XK_{223}	—	December 15, 2001	Socorro	LINEAR	V	1.5 km	MPC · JPL
64812	2001 XO_{225}	—	December 15, 2001	Socorro	LINEAR	MAS	1.4 km	MPC · JPL
64813	2001 XQ_{225}	—	December 15, 2001	Socorro	LINEAR	THM	4.4 km	MPC · JPL
64814	2001 XM_{227}	—	December 15, 2001	Socorro	LINEAR	·	2.8 km	MPC · JPL
64815	2001 XS_{229}	—	December 15, 2001	Socorro	LINEAR	KOR	2.0 km	MPC · JPL
64816	2001 XQ_{235}	—	December 15, 2001	Socorro	LINEAR	·	2.2 km	MPC · JPL
64817	2001 XD_{236}	—	December 15, 2001	Socorro	LINEAR	·	2.3 km	MPC · JPL
64818	2001 XN_{236}	—	December 15, 2001	Socorro	LINEAR	AGN	2.0 km	MPC · JPL
64819	2001 XA_{238}	—	December 15, 2001	Socorro	LINEAR	·	5.9 km	MPC · JPL
64820	2001 XR_{238}	—	December 15, 2001	Socorro	LINEAR	·	4.5 km	MPC · JPL
64821	2001 XJ_{239}	—	December 15, 2001	Socorro	LINEAR	·	4.2 km	MPC · JPL
64822	2001 XM_{240}	—	December 15, 2001	Socorro	LINEAR	·	4.6 km	MPC · JPL
64823	2001 XO_{240}	—	December 15, 2001	Socorro	LINEAR	3:2	6.2 km	MPC · JPL
64824	2001 XB_{241}	—	December 15, 2001	Socorro	LINEAR	·	4.8 km	MPC · JPL
64825	2001 XJ_{243}	—	December 14, 2001	Socorro	LINEAR	·	2.6 km	MPC · JPL
64826	2001 XF_{244}	—	December 15, 2001	Socorro	LINEAR	·	6.3 km	MPC · JPL
64827	2001 XH_{244}	—	December 15, 2001	Socorro	LINEAR	EUN	3.2 km	MPC · JPL
64828	2001 XN_{244}	—	December 15, 2001	Socorro	LINEAR	NYS	1.5 km	MPC · JPL
64829	2001 XS_{245}	—	December 15, 2001	Socorro	LINEAR	NYS	1.3 km	MPC · JPL
64830	2001 XL_{246}	—	December 15, 2001	Socorro	LINEAR	·	4.6 km	MPC · JPL
64831	2001 XT_{246}	—	December 15, 2001	Socorro	LINEAR	·	4.4 km	MPC · JPL
64832	2001 XJ_{251}	—	December 14, 2001	Socorro	LINEAR	·	3.5 km	MPC · JPL
64833	2001 XM_{251}	—	December 14, 2001	Socorro	LINEAR	·	4.7 km	MPC · JPL
64834	2001 XS_{251}	—	December 14, 2001	Socorro	LINEAR	·	4.0 km	MPC · JPL
64835	2001 XH_{254}	—	December 15, 2001	Socorro	LINEAR	MAR	2.9 km	MPC · JPL
64836	2001 XL_{257}	—	December 7, 2001	Socorro	LINEAR	HNS	2.8 km	MPC · JPL
64837	2001 YE_{2}	—	December 18, 2001	Needville	Needville	·	3.1 km	MPC · JPL
64838	2001 YJ_{2}	—	December 18, 2001	Kingsnake	J. V. McClusky	·	11 km	MPC · JPL
64839	2001 YJ_{3}	—	December 19, 2001	Fountain Hills	C. W. Juels, P. R. Holvorcem	EUN ·	4.8 km	MPC · JPL
64840 Cristinapauselli	2001 YW_{5}	Cristinapauselli	December 19, 2001	Cima Ekar	ADAS	·	3.2 km	MPC · JPL
64841	2001 YC_{9}	—	December 17, 2001	Socorro	LINEAR	·	4.7 km	MPC · JPL
64842	2001 YR_{9}	—	December 17, 2001	Socorro	LINEAR	·	6.2 km	MPC · JPL
64843	2001 YB_{11}	—	December 17, 2001	Socorro	LINEAR	KOR	2.8 km	MPC · JPL
64844	2001 YB_{12}	—	December 17, 2001	Socorro	LINEAR	THM	7.0 km	MPC · JPL
64845	2001 YM_{14}	—	December 17, 2001	Socorro	LINEAR	AST	2.8 km	MPC · JPL
64846	2001 YA_{18}	—	December 17, 2001	Socorro	LINEAR	KOR	2.8 km	MPC · JPL
64847	2001 YJ_{18}	—	December 17, 2001	Socorro	LINEAR	·	4.1 km	MPC · JPL
64848	2001 YP_{18}	—	December 17, 2001	Socorro	LINEAR	·	8.2 km	MPC · JPL
64849	2001 YV_{18}	—	December 17, 2001	Socorro	LINEAR	·	3.6 km	MPC · JPL
64850	2001 YM_{19}	—	December 17, 2001	Socorro	LINEAR	(5)	1.9 km	MPC · JPL
64851	2001 YK_{21}	—	December 18, 2001	Socorro	LINEAR	·	2.2 km	MPC · JPL
64852	2001 YH_{22}	—	December 18, 2001	Socorro	LINEAR	·	2.5 km	MPC · JPL
64853	2001 YO_{22}	—	December 18, 2001	Socorro	LINEAR	·	1.6 km	MPC · JPL
64854	2001 YV_{30}	—	December 18, 2001	Socorro	LINEAR	·	1.5 km	MPC · JPL
64855	2001 YA_{35}	—	December 18, 2001	Socorro	LINEAR	EOS	4.3 km	MPC · JPL
64856	2001 YD_{42}	—	December 18, 2001	Socorro	LINEAR	·	4.2 km	MPC · JPL
64857	2001 YE_{42}	—	December 18, 2001	Socorro	LINEAR	·	4.0 km	MPC · JPL
64858	2001 YD_{46}	—	December 18, 2001	Socorro	LINEAR	·	1.8 km	MPC · JPL
64859	2001 YM_{46}	—	December 18, 2001	Socorro	LINEAR	·	2.5 km	MPC · JPL
64860	2001 YX_{48}	—	December 18, 2001	Socorro	LINEAR	PHO	3.0 km	MPC · JPL
64861	2001 YL_{49}	—	December 18, 2001	Socorro	LINEAR	·	3.4 km	MPC · JPL
64862	2001 YO_{50}	—	December 18, 2001	Socorro	LINEAR	THM	6.7 km	MPC · JPL
64863	2001 YQ_{50}	—	December 18, 2001	Socorro	LINEAR	·	3.8 km	MPC · JPL
64864	2001 YN_{52}	—	December 18, 2001	Socorro	LINEAR	(6769)	4.3 km	MPC · JPL
64865	2001 YD_{53}	—	December 18, 2001	Socorro	LINEAR	NYS	2.3 km	MPC · JPL
64866	2001 YS_{57}	—	December 18, 2001	Socorro	LINEAR	·	3.4 km	MPC · JPL
64867	2001 YO_{58}	—	December 18, 2001	Socorro	LINEAR	·	2.6 km	MPC · JPL
64868	2001 YP_{59}	—	December 18, 2001	Socorro	LINEAR	·	2.3 km	MPC · JPL
64869	2001 YG_{60}	—	December 18, 2001	Socorro	LINEAR	·	2.3 km	MPC · JPL
64870	2001 YU_{60}	—	December 18, 2001	Socorro	LINEAR	·	2.7 km	MPC · JPL
64871	2001 YW_{60}	—	December 18, 2001	Socorro	LINEAR	·	2.3 km	MPC · JPL
64872	2001 YX_{60}	—	December 18, 2001	Socorro	LINEAR	·	1.6 km	MPC · JPL
64873	2001 YS_{61}	—	December 18, 2001	Socorro	LINEAR	·	7.0 km	MPC · JPL
64874	2001 YQ_{63}	—	December 18, 2001	Socorro	LINEAR	·	4.1 km	MPC · JPL
64875	2001 YS_{63}	—	December 18, 2001	Socorro	LINEAR	·	1.8 km	MPC · JPL
64876	2001 YG_{64}	—	December 18, 2001	Socorro	LINEAR	PHO	2.4 km	MPC · JPL
64877	2001 YH_{64}	—	December 18, 2001	Socorro	LINEAR	·	2.9 km	MPC · JPL
64878	2001 YB_{67}	—	December 18, 2001	Socorro	LINEAR	·	4.1 km	MPC · JPL
64879	2001 YN_{69}	—	December 18, 2001	Socorro	LINEAR	·	1.8 km	MPC · JPL
64880	2001 YK_{70}	—	December 18, 2001	Socorro	LINEAR	·	2.0 km	MPC · JPL
64881	2001 YU_{70}	—	December 18, 2001	Socorro	LINEAR	·	3.0 km	MPC · JPL
64882	2001 YQ_{72}	—	December 18, 2001	Socorro	LINEAR	·	5.3 km	MPC · JPL
64883	2001 YD_{73}	—	December 18, 2001	Socorro	LINEAR	·	4.1 km	MPC · JPL
64884	2001 YG_{73}	—	December 18, 2001	Socorro	LINEAR	·	5.1 km	MPC · JPL
64885	2001 YH_{73}	—	December 18, 2001	Socorro	LINEAR	·	2.1 km	MPC · JPL
64886	2001 YO_{73}	—	December 18, 2001	Socorro	LINEAR	THM	4.9 km	MPC · JPL
64887	2001 YZ_{73}	—	December 18, 2001	Socorro	LINEAR	·	2.0 km	MPC · JPL
64888	2001 YQ_{75}	—	December 18, 2001	Socorro	LINEAR	·	3.7 km	MPC · JPL
64889	2001 YA_{76}	—	December 18, 2001	Socorro	LINEAR	NYS	2.3 km	MPC · JPL
64890	2001 YE_{76}	—	December 18, 2001	Socorro	LINEAR	·	7.0 km	MPC · JPL
64891	2001 YL_{76}	—	December 18, 2001	Socorro	LINEAR	·	3.4 km	MPC · JPL
64892	2001 YW_{76}	—	December 18, 2001	Socorro	LINEAR	·	4.1 km	MPC · JPL
64893	2001 YP_{77}	—	December 18, 2001	Socorro	LINEAR	·	2.1 km	MPC · JPL
64894	2001 YN_{79}	—	December 18, 2001	Socorro	LINEAR	·	2.0 km	MPC · JPL
64895	2001 YD_{80}	—	December 18, 2001	Socorro	LINEAR	THM	7.3 km	MPC · JPL
64896	2001 YZ_{80}	—	December 18, 2001	Socorro	LINEAR	·	4.0 km	MPC · JPL
64897	2001 YX_{81}	—	December 18, 2001	Socorro	LINEAR	NYS	3.1 km	MPC · JPL
64898	2001 YG_{83}	—	December 18, 2001	Socorro	LINEAR	HYG	5.3 km	MPC · JPL
64899	2001 YJ_{83}	—	December 18, 2001	Socorro	LINEAR	·	7.7 km	MPC · JPL
64900	2001 YG_{84}	—	December 18, 2001	Socorro	LINEAR	·	6.8 km	MPC · JPL

== 64901–65000 ==
back to top

Designation			Discovery			Properties		Ref
Permanent	Provisional	Named after	Date	Site	Discoverer(s)	Category	Diam.	Ref
64901	2001 YJ_{84}	—	December 18, 2001	Socorro	LINEAR	·	2.5 km	MPC · JPL
64902	2001 YG_{85}	—	December 18, 2001	Socorro	LINEAR	·	3.0 km	MPC · JPL
64903	2001 YL_{86}	—	December 18, 2001	Socorro	LINEAR	·	1.5 km	MPC · JPL
64904	2001 YO_{88}	—	December 18, 2001	Socorro	LINEAR	·	1.9 km	MPC · JPL
64905	2001 YD_{89}	—	December 18, 2001	Socorro	LINEAR	·	3.1 km	MPC · JPL
64906	2001 YL_{89}	—	December 18, 2001	Socorro	LINEAR	·	4.2 km	MPC · JPL
64907	2001 YT_{89}	—	December 18, 2001	Socorro	LINEAR	EOS	5.0 km	MPC · JPL
64908	2001 YM_{90}	—	December 18, 2001	Socorro	LINEAR	·	5.3 km	MPC · JPL
64909	2001 YT_{90}	—	December 17, 2001	Palomar	NEAT	·	2.8 km	MPC · JPL
64910	2001 YS_{91}	—	December 17, 2001	Palomar	NEAT	·	2.6 km	MPC · JPL
64911	2001 YT_{91}	—	December 17, 2001	Palomar	NEAT	EOS	3.6 km	MPC · JPL
64912	2001 YY_{91}	—	December 17, 2001	Palomar	NEAT	·	1.9 km	MPC · JPL
64913	2001 YL_{95}	—	December 18, 2001	Palomar	NEAT	·	2.4 km	MPC · JPL
64914	2001 YD_{96}	—	December 18, 2001	Palomar	NEAT	·	5.2 km	MPC · JPL
64915	2001 YQ_{96}	—	December 18, 2001	Palomar	NEAT	·	3.9 km	MPC · JPL
64916	2001 YQ_{97}	—	December 17, 2001	Socorro	LINEAR	·	2.7 km	MPC · JPL
64917	2001 YU_{98}	—	December 17, 2001	Socorro	LINEAR	·	3.3 km	MPC · JPL
64918	2001 YB_{99}	—	December 17, 2001	Socorro	LINEAR	·	5.0 km	MPC · JPL
64919	2001 YZ_{99}	—	December 17, 2001	Socorro	LINEAR	·	1.9 km	MPC · JPL
64920	2001 YS_{101}	—	December 17, 2001	Socorro	LINEAR	·	2.5 km	MPC · JPL
64921	2001 YY_{103}	—	December 17, 2001	Socorro	LINEAR	·	3.3 km	MPC · JPL
64922	2001 YO_{104}	—	December 17, 2001	Socorro	LINEAR	EOS	4.8 km	MPC · JPL
64923	2001 YQ_{104}	—	December 17, 2001	Socorro	LINEAR	·	2.4 km	MPC · JPL
64924	2001 YV_{105}	—	December 17, 2001	Socorro	LINEAR	·	5.9 km	MPC · JPL
64925	2001 YB_{107}	—	December 17, 2001	Socorro	LINEAR	·	3.4 km	MPC · JPL
64926	2001 YF_{107}	—	December 17, 2001	Socorro	LINEAR	·	3.6 km	MPC · JPL
64927	2001 YG_{108}	—	December 17, 2001	Socorro	LINEAR	·	2.0 km	MPC · JPL
64928	2001 YN_{108}	—	December 18, 2001	Socorro	LINEAR	·	2.5 km	MPC · JPL
64929	2001 YO_{108}	—	December 18, 2001	Socorro	LINEAR	V	2.1 km	MPC · JPL
64930	2001 YA_{109}	—	December 18, 2001	Socorro	LINEAR	ERI	3.9 km	MPC · JPL
64931	2001 YO_{109}	—	December 18, 2001	Socorro	LINEAR	NYS	2.9 km	MPC · JPL
64932	2001 YS_{112}	—	December 18, 2001	Anderson Mesa	LONEOS	·	7.3 km	MPC · JPL
64933	2001 YZ_{112}	—	December 19, 2001	Socorro	LINEAR	·	1.6 km	MPC · JPL
64934	2001 YX_{113}	—	December 19, 2001	Socorro	LINEAR	·	9.0 km	MPC · JPL
64935	2001 YJ_{114}	—	December 18, 2001	Palomar	NEAT	·	2.3 km	MPC · JPL
64936	2001 YS_{114}	—	December 19, 2001	Palomar	NEAT	·	7.8 km	MPC · JPL
64937	2001 YE_{115}	—	December 17, 2001	Socorro	LINEAR	·	4.9 km	MPC · JPL
64938	2001 YH_{116}	—	December 17, 2001	Socorro	LINEAR	·	7.6 km	MPC · JPL
64939	2001 YP_{116}	—	December 18, 2001	Socorro	LINEAR	·	2.3 km	MPC · JPL
64940	2001 YS_{116}	—	December 18, 2001	Socorro	LINEAR	·	2.1 km	MPC · JPL
64941	2001 YJ_{118}	—	December 18, 2001	Socorro	LINEAR	·	9.4 km	MPC · JPL
64942	2001 YO_{120}	—	December 20, 2001	Socorro	LINEAR	·	3.3 km	MPC · JPL
64943	2001 YZ_{120}	—	December 20, 2001	Kitt Peak	Spacewatch	·	7.3 km	MPC · JPL
64944	2001 YG_{121}	—	December 17, 2001	Socorro	LINEAR	·	1.5 km	MPC · JPL
64945	2001 YY_{122}	—	December 17, 2001	Socorro	LINEAR	·	1.5 km	MPC · JPL
64946	2001 YF_{123}	—	December 17, 2001	Socorro	LINEAR	·	4.4 km	MPC · JPL
64947	2001 YQ_{123}	—	December 17, 2001	Socorro	LINEAR	·	2.5 km	MPC · JPL
64948	2001 YH_{124}	—	December 17, 2001	Socorro	LINEAR	·	2.4 km	MPC · JPL
64949	2001 YO_{124}	—	December 17, 2001	Socorro	LINEAR	V	2.6 km	MPC · JPL
64950	2001 YT_{124}	—	December 17, 2001	Socorro	LINEAR	·	3.0 km	MPC · JPL
64951	2001 YY_{124}	—	December 17, 2001	Socorro	LINEAR	·	7.6 km	MPC · JPL
64952	2001 YU_{125}	—	December 17, 2001	Socorro	LINEAR	EUN	3.0 km	MPC · JPL
64953	2001 YM_{127}	—	December 17, 2001	Socorro	LINEAR	EOS	4.0 km	MPC · JPL
64954	2001 YZ_{127}	—	December 17, 2001	Socorro	LINEAR	·	2.1 km	MPC · JPL
64955	2001 YO_{128}	—	December 17, 2001	Socorro	LINEAR	·	1.9 km	MPC · JPL
64956	2001 YU_{128}	—	December 17, 2001	Socorro	LINEAR	·	6.5 km	MPC · JPL
64957	2001 YE_{131}	—	December 17, 2001	Socorro	LINEAR	·	4.8 km	MPC · JPL
64958	2001 YT_{131}	—	December 19, 2001	Socorro	LINEAR	·	6.6 km	MPC · JPL
64959	2001 YW_{134}	—	December 19, 2001	Socorro	LINEAR	·	3.6 km	MPC · JPL
64960	2001 YT_{136}	—	December 22, 2001	Socorro	LINEAR	EOS	3.3 km	MPC · JPL
64961	2001 YU_{137}	—	December 22, 2001	Socorro	LINEAR	·	6.7 km	MPC · JPL
64962	2001 YR_{139}	—	December 24, 2001	Haleakala	NEAT	EUN	3.8 km	MPC · JPL
64963	2001 YP_{144}	—	December 17, 2001	Socorro	LINEAR	slow	2.7 km	MPC · JPL
64964	2001 YF_{149}	—	December 19, 2001	Palomar	NEAT	·	4.5 km	MPC · JPL
64965	2001 YD_{155}	—	December 20, 2001	Palomar	NEAT	·	3.4 km	MPC · JPL
64966	2001 YB_{157}	—	December 19, 2001	Palomar	NEAT	EOS	5.7 km	MPC · JPL
64967	2002 AV_{1}	—	January 6, 2002	Oizumi	T. Kobayashi	THM	7.5 km	MPC · JPL
64968	2002 AW_{2}	—	January 6, 2002	Socorro	LINEAR	PHO	5.4 km	MPC · JPL
64969	2002 AA_{4}	—	January 5, 2002	Socorro	LINEAR	PHO	2.6 km	MPC · JPL
64970	2002 AJ_{5}	—	January 9, 2002	Oizumi	T. Kobayashi	PHO	3.7 km	MPC · JPL
64971	2002 AC_{6}	—	January 5, 2002	Kitt Peak	Spacewatch	·	2.3 km	MPC · JPL
64972	2002 AT_{9}	—	January 11, 2002	Desert Eagle	W. K. Y. Yeung	·	3.6 km	MPC · JPL
64973	2002 AC_{10}	—	January 11, 2002	Desert Eagle	W. K. Y. Yeung	·	2.4 km	MPC · JPL
64974 Savaria	2002 AF_{11}	Savaria	January 11, 2002	Piszkéstető	K. Sárneczky, Z. Heiner	THM	7.4 km	MPC · JPL
64975 Gianrix	2002 AG_{12}	Gianrix	January 10, 2002	Campo Imperatore	CINEOS	·	3.8 km	MPC · JPL
64976	2002 AK_{19}	—	January 8, 2002	Socorro	LINEAR	·	4.0 km	MPC · JPL
64977	2002 AL_{20}	—	January 5, 2002	Haleakala	NEAT	·	8.7 km	MPC · JPL
64978	2002 AW_{20}	—	January 7, 2002	Haleakala	NEAT	·	2.8 km	MPC · JPL
64979	2002 AZ_{22}	—	January 5, 2002	Haleakala	NEAT	V	1.8 km	MPC · JPL
64980	2002 AP_{23}	—	January 5, 2002	Haleakala	NEAT	·	9.3 km	MPC · JPL
64981	2002 AR_{24}	—	January 8, 2002	Palomar	NEAT	V	1.5 km	MPC · JPL
64982	2002 AV_{37}	—	January 9, 2002	Socorro	LINEAR	·	3.8 km	MPC · JPL
64983	2002 AX_{40}	—	January 9, 2002	Socorro	LINEAR	·	1.9 km	MPC · JPL
64984	2002 AV_{41}	—	January 9, 2002	Socorro	LINEAR	·	4.6 km	MPC · JPL
64985	2002 AT_{48}	—	January 9, 2002	Socorro	LINEAR	EOS	3.3 km	MPC · JPL
64986	2002 AX_{50}	—	January 9, 2002	Socorro	LINEAR	THM	6.5 km	MPC · JPL
64987	2002 AZ_{50}	—	January 9, 2002	Socorro	LINEAR	·	5.8 km	MPC · JPL
64988	2002 AH_{52}	—	January 9, 2002	Socorro	LINEAR	·	1.9 km	MPC · JPL
64989	2002 AG_{54}	—	January 9, 2002	Socorro	LINEAR	·	1.6 km	MPC · JPL
64990	2002 AK_{54}	—	January 9, 2002	Socorro	LINEAR	HYG	6.3 km	MPC · JPL
64991	2002 AO_{54}	—	January 9, 2002	Socorro	LINEAR	·	2.6 km	MPC · JPL
64992	2002 AR_{54}	—	January 9, 2002	Socorro	LINEAR	·	6.7 km	MPC · JPL
64993	2002 AM_{56}	—	January 9, 2002	Socorro	LINEAR	·	2.5 km	MPC · JPL
64994	2002 AE_{57}	—	January 9, 2002	Socorro	LINEAR	NYS	3.0 km	MPC · JPL
64995	2002 AV_{57}	—	January 9, 2002	Socorro	LINEAR	·	4.2 km	MPC · JPL
64996	2002 AG_{60}	—	January 9, 2002	Socorro	LINEAR	EOS	4.7 km	MPC · JPL
64997	2002 AP_{60}	—	January 9, 2002	Socorro	LINEAR	·	3.8 km	MPC · JPL
64998	2002 AL_{63}	—	January 11, 2002	Socorro	LINEAR	·	1.7 km	MPC · JPL
64999	2002 AS_{63}	—	January 11, 2002	Socorro	LINEAR	·	1.5 km	MPC · JPL
65000	2002 AV_{63}	—	January 11, 2002	Socorro	LINEAR	L4	24 km	MPC · JPL

back to top

== See also ==
- Meanings of minor-planet names: 64001–65000
