= Meanings of minor-planet names: 64001–65000 =

As minor planet discoveries are confirmed, they are given a permanent number by the IAU's Minor Planet Center (MPC), and the discoverers can then submit names for them, following the IAU's naming conventions. The list below concerns those minor planets in the specified number-range that have received names, and explains the meanings of those names.

Official naming citations of newly named small Solar System bodies are approved and published in a bulletin by IAU's Working Group for Small Bodies Nomenclature (WGSBN). Before May 2021, citations were published in MPC's Minor Planet Circulars for many decades. Recent citations can also be found on the JPL Small-Body Database (SBDB). Until his death in 2016, German astronomer Lutz D. Schmadel compiled these citations into the Dictionary of Minor Planet Names (DMP) and regularly updated the collection.

Based on Paul Herget's The Names of the Minor Planets, Schmadel also researched the unclear origin of numerous asteroids, most of which had been named prior to World War II. This article incorporates text from this source, which is in the public domain: SBDB New namings may only be added to this list below after official publication as the preannouncement of names is condemned. The WGSBN publishes a comprehensive guideline for the naming rules of non-cometary small Solar System bodies.

== 64001–64100 ==
Named minor planet	Provisional	This minor planet was named for...	Ref · Catalog
64070 NEAT	2001 SS_{272}	The Near Earth Asteroid Tracking (NEAT) programme, a joint-venture of the United States Air Force and the Jet Propulsion Laboratory, began operations in December 1995. The program currently utilizes 1.2-meter telescopes with NEAT CCD cameras at two observing locations, Palomar Mountain and the Maui Space Surveillance Site.	JPL · 64070

== 64101–64200 ==
back to top

Named minor planet	Provisional	This minor planet was named for...	Ref · Catalog
There are no named minor planets in this number range

== 64201–64300 ==
back to top

Named minor planet	Provisional	This minor planet was named for...	Ref · Catalog
64288 Lamchiuying	2001 UL_{10}	Lam Chiu Ying (born 1949) has been the department head of Hong Kong Observatory, China. He is also the former chairman of Hong Kong Bird Watch Society and spends a lot of effort in promoting public awareness of global warming.	JPL · 64288
64289 Shihwingching	2001 UA_{11}	Shih Wing-ching (born 1949), a Chinese columnist who writes for a free daily newspaper in Hong Kong. He has been an active philanthropist.	JPL · 64289
64290 Yaushingtung	2001 UD_{11}	Shing-Tung Yau (born 1949), a Chinese-American mathematician who specializes in differential geometry.. He received the Fields Medal in 1982 for his contribution to the Calabi conjecture in algebraic geometry. He also received a MacArthur Fellowship in 1984 and the Wolf prize in Mathematics in 2009.	JPL · 64290
64291 Anglee	2001 UX_{11}	Ang Lee (born 1954), a Taiwanese-American film director, whose films include The Wedding Banquet (1993), Crouching Tiger, Hidden Dragon (2000) and Brokeback Mountain (2005). This last film won him the Academy Award for Best Director.	JPL · 64291
64295 Tangtisheng	2001 UW_{13}	Tang Ti-sheng (1917–1959), a Cantonese opera playwright, scriptwriter and film director. During his 20-year career, Tang composed over 400 operas and achieved immense popularity within the Cantonese opera scene. His most famous works include Red Tears of an Aspen and The Reincarnation of Lady Plum Blossom.	JPL · 64295
64296 Hokoon	2001 UB_{14}	Ho Koon Nature Education cum Astronomical Center, established in 1995, was the first special school in Hong Kong dedicated to science education. The words Ho Koon in Chinese mean "to observe" and comes from an ancient Chinese poem saying that one could be joyful through the observation of our physical Universe.	JPL · 64296

== 64301–64400 ==
back to top

Named minor planet	Provisional	This minor planet was named for...	Ref · Catalog
There are no named minor planets in this number range

== 64401–64500 ==
back to top

Named minor planet	Provisional	This minor planet was named for...	Ref · Catalog
There are no named minor planets in this number range

== 64501–64600 ==
back to top

Named minor planet	Provisional	This minor planet was named for...	Ref · Catalog
64547 Saku	2001 WF	In Saku City, JAXA operates the Usuda Deep Space Center equipped with a 64-m-diameter parabolic antenna, which has been used to communicate with Japanese solar system probes, such as the Halley's comet probes "Sakigake" and "Suisei", the asteroid probe "Hayabusa" and the lunar orbiter "Kaguya" amongst others.	JPL · 64547
64553 Segorbe	2001 WR_{15}	Segorbe, municipality of Castelló province, Spain, where the discovery occurred †	MPC · 64553

== 64601–64700 ==
back to top

Named minor planet	Provisional	This minor planet was named for...	Ref · Catalog
There are no named minor planets in this number range

== 64701–64800 ==
back to top

Named minor planet	Provisional	This minor planet was named for...	Ref · Catalog
There are no named minor planets in this number range

== 64801–64900 ==
back to top

Named minor planet	Provisional	This minor planet was named for...	Ref · Catalog
64840 Cristinapauselli	2001 YW_{5}	Cristina Pauselli, Italian Associate Professor of Geophysics at the University of Perugia, Italy.	IAU · 64840

== 64901–65000 ==
back to top

Named minor planet	Provisional	This minor planet was named for...	Ref · Catalog
64974 Savaria	2002 AF_{11}	Savaria was the Roman name of today's Hungarian town of Szombathely, the administrative center of the Vas county, located near the border with Austria. This naming also honors István Jankovics, director of the Gothard Astrophysical Observatory in Szombathely and discoverer of the supernovae 1968J, 1968S and 1969C.	JPL · 64974
64975 Gianrix	2002 AG_{12}	Gianrico Filacchione (born 1972), an Italian astronomer who worked on the in-flight calibration of the imaging spectrometer VIMS-V on the Cassini mission. He currently studies Saturn's rings and hyperspectral data on icy satellites and is in charge of the calibration pipeline of Rosetta-VIRTIS, Dawn-VIR and Bepicolombo-VIHI experiments (IAU).	JPL · 64975

back to top

Preceded by 63,001–64,000	Meanings of minor-planet names List of minor planets: 64,001–65,000	Succeeded by 65,001–66,000
