= List of minor planets: 62001–63000 =

The following is a partial list of minor planets, running from minor-planet number 62001 through 63000, inclusive. The primary data for this and other partial lists is based on JPL's "Small-Body Orbital Elements" and data available from the Minor Planet Center. Critical list information is also provided by the MPC, unless otherwise specified from Lowell Observatory. A detailed description of the table's columns and additional sources are given on the main page including a complete list of every page in this series, and a statistical break-up on the dynamical classification of minor planets.

Also see the summary list of all named bodies in numerical and alphabetical order, and the corresponding naming citations for the number range of this particular list. New namings may only be added to this list after official publication, as the preannouncement of names is condemned by the Working Group for Small Bodies Nomenclature of the International Astronomical Union.

Near-Earth obj.	MBA (inner)	MBA (outer)	Centaur
Mars-crosser	MBA (middle)	Jupiter trojan	Trans-Neptunian obj.
Unclassified

== 62001–62100 ==
Designation			Discovery			Properties		Ref
Permanent	Provisional	Named after	Date	Site	Discoverer(s)	Category	Diam.	Ref
62001	2000 RK_{36}	—	September 3, 2000	Kitt Peak	Spacewatch	·	3.3 km	MPC · JPL
62002	2000 RT_{37}	—	September 4, 2000	Socorro	LINEAR	·	6.0 km	MPC · JPL
62003	2000 RB_{38}	—	September 5, 2000	Kvistaberg	Uppsala-DLR Asteroid Survey	·	5.2 km	MPC · JPL
62004	2000 RG_{38}	—	September 5, 2000	Kvistaberg	Uppsala-DLR Asteroid Survey	·	3.0 km	MPC · JPL
62005	2000 RP_{38}	—	September 1, 2000	Socorro	LINEAR	·	3.2 km	MPC · JPL
62006	2000 RQ_{38}	—	September 2, 2000	Socorro	LINEAR	·	3.6 km	MPC · JPL
62007	2000 RP_{39}	—	September 1, 2000	Socorro	LINEAR	NYS	2.0 km	MPC · JPL
62008	2000 RR_{39}	—	September 1, 2000	Socorro	LINEAR	HYG	13 km	MPC · JPL
62009	2000 RX_{39}	—	September 2, 2000	Socorro	LINEAR	·	9.1 km	MPC · JPL
62010	2000 RX_{40}	—	September 3, 2000	Socorro	LINEAR	EOS	6.0 km	MPC · JPL
62011	2000 RG_{41}	—	September 3, 2000	Socorro	LINEAR	·	5.9 km	MPC · JPL
62012	2000 RJ_{41}	—	September 3, 2000	Socorro	LINEAR	EOS	5.6 km	MPC · JPL
62013	2000 RM_{41}	—	September 3, 2000	Socorro	LINEAR	·	5.9 km	MPC · JPL
62014	2000 RJ_{42}	—	September 3, 2000	Socorro	LINEAR	·	4.5 km	MPC · JPL
62015	2000 RN_{42}	—	September 3, 2000	Socorro	LINEAR	·	4.4 km	MPC · JPL
62016	2000 RP_{42}	—	September 3, 2000	Socorro	LINEAR	EOS	5.7 km	MPC · JPL
62017	2000 RR_{42}	—	September 3, 2000	Socorro	LINEAR	(5651)	7.5 km	MPC · JPL
62018	2000 RV_{42}	—	September 3, 2000	Socorro	LINEAR	EOS	4.9 km	MPC · JPL
62019	2000 RQ_{44}	—	September 3, 2000	Socorro	LINEAR	EOS	5.7 km	MPC · JPL
62020	2000 RT_{45}	—	September 3, 2000	Socorro	LINEAR	·	2.2 km	MPC · JPL
62021	2000 RL_{46}	—	September 3, 2000	Socorro	LINEAR	NYS	2.2 km	MPC · JPL
62022	2000 RA_{48}	—	September 3, 2000	Socorro	LINEAR	·	8.2 km	MPC · JPL
62023	2000 RQ_{48}	—	September 3, 2000	Socorro	LINEAR	·	3.4 km	MPC · JPL
62024	2000 RF_{50}	—	September 5, 2000	Socorro	LINEAR	·	3.1 km	MPC · JPL
62025	2000 RQ_{50}	—	September 5, 2000	Socorro	LINEAR	·	11 km	MPC · JPL
62026	2000 RZ_{50}	—	September 5, 2000	Socorro	LINEAR	AEG	7.6 km	MPC · JPL
62027	2000 RW_{52}	—	September 4, 2000	Socorro	LINEAR	V	2.0 km	MPC · JPL
62028	2000 RE_{53}	—	September 1, 2000	Črni Vrh	H. Mikuž, S. Matičič	·	4.4 km	MPC · JPL
62029	2000 RD_{55}	—	September 3, 2000	Socorro	LINEAR	·	12 km	MPC · JPL
62030	2000 RK_{56}	—	September 6, 2000	Socorro	LINEAR	·	8.9 km	MPC · JPL
62031	2000 RS_{56}	—	September 5, 2000	Prescott	P. G. Comba	·	3.8 km	MPC · JPL
62032	2000 RG_{58}	—	September 7, 2000	Kitt Peak	Spacewatch	·	3.9 km	MPC · JPL
62033	2000 RC_{59}	—	September 7, 2000	Kitt Peak	Spacewatch	·	1.9 km	MPC · JPL
62034	2000 RE_{60}	—	September 8, 2000	Desert Beaver	W. K. Y. Yeung	·	4.2 km	MPC · JPL
62035	2000 RC_{62}	—	September 1, 2000	Socorro	LINEAR	·	3.1 km	MPC · JPL
62036	2000 RJ_{62}	—	September 1, 2000	Socorro	LINEAR	URS	14 km	MPC · JPL
62037	2000 RQ_{62}	—	September 1, 2000	Socorro	LINEAR	·	2.4 km	MPC · JPL
62038	2000 RX_{63}	—	September 3, 2000	Socorro	LINEAR	HYG	7.6 km	MPC · JPL
62039	2000 RZ_{63}	—	September 3, 2000	Socorro	LINEAR	·	7.3 km	MPC · JPL
62040	2000 RA_{64}	—	September 3, 2000	Socorro	LINEAR	·	3.3 km	MPC · JPL
62041	2000 RD_{65}	—	September 1, 2000	Socorro	LINEAR	·	2.9 km	MPC · JPL
62042	2000 RF_{65}	—	September 1, 2000	Socorro	LINEAR	·	3.1 km	MPC · JPL
62043	2000 RH_{65}	—	September 1, 2000	Socorro	LINEAR	slow	9.6 km	MPC · JPL
62044	2000 RU_{65}	—	September 1, 2000	Socorro	LINEAR	·	2.9 km	MPC · JPL
62045	2000 RV_{65}	—	September 1, 2000	Socorro	LINEAR	V	1.5 km	MPC · JPL
62046	2000 RA_{66}	—	September 1, 2000	Socorro	LINEAR	·	1.9 km	MPC · JPL
62047	2000 RE_{66}	—	September 1, 2000	Socorro	LINEAR	·	2.7 km	MPC · JPL
62048	2000 RC_{67}	—	September 1, 2000	Socorro	LINEAR	NYS ·	4.0 km	MPC · JPL
62049	2000 RH_{67}	—	September 1, 2000	Socorro	LINEAR	NYS	2.7 km	MPC · JPL
62050	2000 RM_{67}	—	September 1, 2000	Socorro	LINEAR	(5)	3.4 km	MPC · JPL
62051	2000 RV_{68}	—	September 2, 2000	Socorro	LINEAR	·	4.8 km	MPC · JPL
62052	2000 RA_{69}	—	September 2, 2000	Socorro	LINEAR	fast	4.0 km	MPC · JPL
62053	2000 RB_{69}	—	September 2, 2000	Socorro	LINEAR	HYG	8.1 km	MPC · JPL
62054	2000 RD_{69}	—	September 2, 2000	Socorro	LINEAR	HYG	7.4 km	MPC · JPL
62055	2000 RF_{69}	—	September 2, 2000	Socorro	LINEAR	·	4.7 km	MPC · JPL
62056	2000 RS_{69}	—	September 2, 2000	Socorro	LINEAR	EOS	4.5 km	MPC · JPL
62057	2000 RY_{69}	—	September 2, 2000	Socorro	LINEAR	·	2.8 km	MPC · JPL
62058	2000 RN_{70}	—	September 2, 2000	Socorro	LINEAR	·	5.2 km	MPC · JPL
62059	2000 RO_{70}	—	September 2, 2000	Socorro	LINEAR	·	2.3 km	MPC · JPL
62060	2000 RB_{71}	—	September 2, 2000	Socorro	LINEAR	·	4.1 km	MPC · JPL
62061	2000 RU_{71}	—	September 2, 2000	Socorro	LINEAR	(5)	2.9 km	MPC · JPL
62062	2000 RV_{71}	—	September 2, 2000	Socorro	LINEAR	·	3.3 km	MPC · JPL
62063	2000 RA_{72}	—	September 2, 2000	Socorro	LINEAR	·	1.7 km	MPC · JPL
62064	2000 RA_{73}	—	September 2, 2000	Socorro	LINEAR	·	3.1 km	MPC · JPL
62065	2000 RH_{73}	—	September 2, 2000	Socorro	LINEAR	·	3.5 km	MPC · JPL
62066	2000 RM_{73}	—	September 2, 2000	Socorro	LINEAR	·	4.7 km	MPC · JPL
62067	2000 RG_{74}	—	September 2, 2000	Socorro	LINEAR	MAR	4.8 km	MPC · JPL
62068	2000 RF_{75}	—	September 3, 2000	Socorro	LINEAR	·	4.2 km	MPC · JPL
62069	2000 RK_{76}	—	September 4, 2000	Socorro	LINEAR	·	5.7 km	MPC · JPL
62070	2000 RC_{77}	—	September 7, 2000	Socorro	LINEAR	EOS	7.4 km	MPC · JPL
62071 Voegtli	2000 RH_{77}	Voegtli	September 8, 2000	Gnosca	S. Sposetti	·	5.1 km	MPC · JPL
62072	2000 RD_{78}	—	September 9, 2000	Črni Vrh	Matičič, S.	·	3.9 km	MPC · JPL
62073	2000 RX_{78}	—	September 10, 2000	Črni Vrh	Skvarč, J.	V	3.0 km	MPC · JPL
62074	2000 RL_{79}	—	September 8, 2000	Socorro	LINEAR	HNS	4.6 km	MPC · JPL
62075	2000 RO_{79}	—	September 1, 2000	Socorro	LINEAR	·	4.3 km	MPC · JPL
62076	2000 RH_{80}	—	September 1, 2000	Socorro	LINEAR	·	7.9 km	MPC · JPL
62077	2000 RE_{81}	—	September 1, 2000	Socorro	LINEAR	MAR	2.6 km	MPC · JPL
62078	2000 RS_{81}	—	September 1, 2000	Socorro	LINEAR	EUN	3.2 km	MPC · JPL
62079	2000 RX_{81}	—	September 1, 2000	Socorro	LINEAR	·	8.8 km	MPC · JPL
62080	2000 RG_{82}	—	September 1, 2000	Socorro	LINEAR	·	5.7 km	MPC · JPL
62081	2000 RS_{82}	—	September 1, 2000	Socorro	LINEAR	ADE	7.2 km	MPC · JPL
62082	2000 RZ_{82}	—	September 1, 2000	Socorro	LINEAR	·	3.1 km	MPC · JPL
62083	2000 RF_{84}	—	September 2, 2000	Anderson Mesa	LONEOS	·	3.4 km	MPC · JPL
62084	2000 RA_{86}	—	September 2, 2000	Socorro	LINEAR	VER	7.1 km	MPC · JPL
62085	2000 RO_{87}	—	September 2, 2000	Anderson Mesa	LONEOS	NYS	2.0 km	MPC · JPL
62086	2000 RY_{87}	—	September 2, 2000	Anderson Mesa	LONEOS	·	6.0 km	MPC · JPL
62087	2000 RC_{88}	—	September 2, 2000	Haleakala	NEAT	·	6.4 km	MPC · JPL
62088	2000 RY_{88}	—	September 3, 2000	Socorro	LINEAR	·	4.9 km	MPC · JPL
62089	2000 RM_{89}	—	September 3, 2000	Socorro	LINEAR	·	2.6 km	MPC · JPL
62090	2000 RR_{91}	—	September 3, 2000	Socorro	LINEAR	GEF	2.3 km	MPC · JPL
62091	2000 RW_{91}	—	September 3, 2000	Socorro	LINEAR	NYS ·	4.0 km	MPC · JPL
62092	2000 RM_{92}	—	September 3, 2000	Socorro	LINEAR	·	2.7 km	MPC · JPL
62093	2000 RQ_{92}	—	September 3, 2000	Socorro	LINEAR	·	2.5 km	MPC · JPL
62094	2000 RU_{92}	—	September 3, 2000	Socorro	LINEAR	PAD	4.5 km	MPC · JPL
62095	2000 RW_{92}	—	September 3, 2000	Kitt Peak	Spacewatch	·	7.8 km	MPC · JPL
62096	2000 RF_{94}	—	September 4, 2000	Anderson Mesa	LONEOS	HOF	8.2 km	MPC · JPL
62097	2000 RJ_{94}	—	September 4, 2000	Anderson Mesa	LONEOS	·	2.5 km	MPC · JPL
62098	2000 RO_{94}	—	September 4, 2000	Anderson Mesa	LONEOS	·	4.3 km	MPC · JPL
62099	2000 RP_{94}	—	September 4, 2000	Anderson Mesa	LONEOS	NYS	2.5 km	MPC · JPL
62100	2000 RA_{95}	—	September 4, 2000	Anderson Mesa	LONEOS	·	3.2 km	MPC · JPL

== 62101–62200 ==
back to top

Designation			Discovery			Properties		Ref
Permanent	Provisional	Named after	Date	Site	Discoverer(s)	Category	Diam.	Ref
62101	2000 RC_{95}	—	September 4, 2000	Anderson Mesa	LONEOS	·	10 km	MPC · JPL
62102	2000 RE_{95}	—	September 4, 2000	Anderson Mesa	LONEOS	NYS	2.4 km	MPC · JPL
62103	2000 RS_{95}	—	September 4, 2000	Anderson Mesa	LONEOS	AGN	2.8 km	MPC · JPL
62104	2000 RZ_{95}	—	September 4, 2000	Anderson Mesa	LONEOS	NYS	1.4 km	MPC · JPL
62105	2000 RN_{96}	—	September 4, 2000	Haleakala	NEAT	EUN	3.4 km	MPC · JPL
62106	2000 RC_{97}	—	September 5, 2000	Anderson Mesa	LONEOS	PHO	2.9 km	MPC · JPL
62107	2000 RF_{97}	—	September 5, 2000	Anderson Mesa	LONEOS	slow	12 km	MPC · JPL
62108	2000 RS_{97}	—	September 5, 2000	Anderson Mesa	LONEOS	·	10 km	MPC · JPL
62109	2000 RT_{97}	—	September 5, 2000	Anderson Mesa	LONEOS	HNS	3.3 km	MPC · JPL
62110	2000 RX_{97}	—	September 5, 2000	Anderson Mesa	LONEOS	·	7.9 km	MPC · JPL
62111	2000 RG_{99}	—	September 5, 2000	Anderson Mesa	LONEOS	·	6.8 km	MPC · JPL
62112	2000 RM_{99}	—	September 5, 2000	Anderson Mesa	LONEOS	·	5.3 km	MPC · JPL
62113	2000 RP_{99}	—	September 5, 2000	Anderson Mesa	LONEOS	·	9.1 km	MPC · JPL
62114	2000 RV_{99}	—	September 5, 2000	Anderson Mesa	LONEOS	L5	20 km	MPC · JPL
62115	2000 RW_{99}	—	September 5, 2000	Anderson Mesa	LONEOS	·	3.7 km	MPC · JPL
62116	2000 RC_{101}	—	September 5, 2000	Anderson Mesa	LONEOS	MAR	4.7 km	MPC · JPL
62117	2000 RC_{102}	—	September 5, 2000	Anderson Mesa	LONEOS	·	10 km	MPC · JPL
62118	2000 RG_{102}	—	September 5, 2000	Anderson Mesa	LONEOS	·	9.3 km	MPC · JPL
62119	2000 RH_{102}	—	September 5, 2000	Anderson Mesa	LONEOS	EOS	5.8 km	MPC · JPL
62120	2000 RL_{102}	—	September 5, 2000	Anderson Mesa	LONEOS	·	7.9 km	MPC · JPL
62121	2000 RO_{102}	—	September 5, 2000	Anderson Mesa	LONEOS	MAR	2.9 km	MPC · JPL
62122	2000 RS_{102}	—	September 5, 2000	Anderson Mesa	LONEOS	·	4.9 km	MPC · JPL
62123	2000 RC_{103}	—	September 5, 2000	Anderson Mesa	LONEOS	·	3.2 km	MPC · JPL
62124	2000 RP_{103}	—	September 5, 2000	Anderson Mesa	LONEOS	MAR	4.8 km	MPC · JPL
62125	2000 RU_{104}	—	September 6, 2000	Socorro	LINEAR	(8737)	9.6 km	MPC · JPL
62126	2000 RW_{104}	—	September 6, 2000	Socorro	LINEAR	·	9.1 km	MPC · JPL
62127	2000 RY_{105}	—	September 5, 2000	Socorro	LINEAR	·	2.9 km	MPC · JPL
62128	2000 SO_{1}	—	September 18, 2000	Socorro	LINEAR	EUP	23 km	MPC · JPL
62129	2000 SR_{1}	—	September 19, 2000	Socorro	LINEAR	·	2.1 km	MPC · JPL
62130	2000 SS_{1}	—	September 20, 2000	Desert Beaver	W. K. Y. Yeung	(5)	2.5 km	MPC · JPL
62131	2000 SH_{4}	—	September 21, 2000	Ametlla de Mar	J. Nomen	EOS	4.8 km	MPC · JPL
62132	2000 SJ_{4}	—	September 21, 2000	Ametlla de Mar	J. Nomen	V	1.6 km	MPC · JPL
62133	2000 SD_{5}	—	September 20, 2000	Socorro	LINEAR	PHO	5.4 km	MPC · JPL
62134	2000 SJ_{5}	—	September 21, 2000	Olathe	Robinson, L.	·	6.0 km	MPC · JPL
62135	2000 SA_{6}	—	September 20, 2000	Socorro	LINEAR	PHO	2.8 km	MPC · JPL
62136	2000 SR_{6}	—	September 21, 2000	Socorro	LINEAR	·	2.7 km	MPC · JPL
62137	2000 SM_{7}	—	September 22, 2000	Kitt Peak	Spacewatch	·	8.8 km	MPC · JPL
62138	2000 SO_{8}	—	September 22, 2000	Prescott	P. G. Comba	V	1.3 km	MPC · JPL
62139	2000 SB_{12}	—	September 20, 2000	Socorro	LINEAR	·	2.6 km	MPC · JPL
62140	2000 SG_{12}	—	September 20, 2000	Socorro	LINEAR	·	2.6 km	MPC · JPL
62141	2000 SK_{12}	—	September 20, 2000	Socorro	LINEAR	·	2.9 km	MPC · JPL
62142	2000 SQ_{13}	—	September 21, 2000	Socorro	LINEAR	·	4.3 km	MPC · JPL
62143	2000 SJ_{14}	—	September 23, 2000	Socorro	LINEAR	·	5.1 km	MPC · JPL
62144	2000 SU_{15}	—	September 23, 2000	Socorro	LINEAR	EUN	3.0 km	MPC · JPL
62145	2000 SH_{16}	—	September 23, 2000	Socorro	LINEAR	HIL · 3:2	12 km	MPC · JPL
62146	2000 SV_{16}	—	September 23, 2000	Socorro	LINEAR	·	6.3 km	MPC · JPL
62147	2000 SB_{18}	—	September 23, 2000	Socorro	LINEAR	EMA	6.7 km	MPC · JPL
62148	2000 SQ_{18}	—	September 23, 2000	Socorro	LINEAR	·	4.4 km	MPC · JPL
62149	2000 ST_{19}	—	September 23, 2000	Socorro	LINEAR	·	13 km	MPC · JPL
62150	2000 SE_{20}	—	September 23, 2000	Socorro	LINEAR	·	8.0 km	MPC · JPL
62151 Mayumisuzuki	2000 SZ_{20}	Mayumisuzuki	September 24, 2000	Bisei SG Center	BATTeRS	·	4.3 km	MPC · JPL
62152 Akatsuki	2000 SC_{21}	Akatsuki	September 24, 2000	Bisei SG Center	BATTeRS	·	3.9 km	MPC · JPL
62153	2000 SD_{21}	—	September 24, 2000	Bisei SG Center	BATTeRS	·	5.7 km	MPC · JPL
62154	2000 SH_{22}	—	September 20, 2000	Haleakala	NEAT	·	7.2 km	MPC · JPL
62155	2000 SD_{23}	—	September 25, 2000	Višnjan Observatory	K. Korlević	·	2.8 km	MPC · JPL
62156	2000 SL_{23}	—	September 26, 2000	Višnjan Observatory	K. Korlević	EUN	3.3 km	MPC · JPL
62157	2000 SH_{24}	—	September 24, 2000	Socorro	LINEAR	H	1.2 km	MPC · JPL
62158	2000 SK_{25}	—	September 23, 2000	Socorro	LINEAR	PHO	2.8 km	MPC · JPL
62159	2000 SO_{25}	—	September 23, 2000	Socorro	LINEAR	ADE	6.1 km	MPC · JPL
62160	2000 ST_{25}	—	September 23, 2000	Socorro	LINEAR	EUN	6.3 km	MPC · JPL
62161	2000 SU_{25}	—	September 23, 2000	Socorro	LINEAR	·	2.2 km	MPC · JPL
62162	2000 SJ_{26}	—	September 23, 2000	Socorro	LINEAR	NAE	7.5 km	MPC · JPL
62163	2000 SE_{27}	—	September 23, 2000	Socorro	LINEAR	·	6.2 km	MPC · JPL
62164	2000 SB_{28}	—	September 23, 2000	Socorro	LINEAR	EOS	4.1 km	MPC · JPL
62165	2000 SM_{29}	—	September 24, 2000	Socorro	LINEAR	HYG	6.3 km	MPC · JPL
62166	2000 SM_{30}	—	September 24, 2000	Socorro	LINEAR	·	1.4 km	MPC · JPL
62167	2000 SG_{31}	—	September 24, 2000	Socorro	LINEAR	·	3.4 km	MPC · JPL
62168	2000 SK_{32}	—	September 24, 2000	Socorro	LINEAR	·	1.6 km	MPC · JPL
62169	2000 SZ_{32}	—	September 24, 2000	Socorro	LINEAR	·	3.0 km	MPC · JPL
62170	2000 SD_{33}	—	September 24, 2000	Socorro	LINEAR	·	3.0 km	MPC · JPL
62171	2000 SH_{33}	—	September 24, 2000	Socorro	LINEAR	·	2.7 km	MPC · JPL
62172	2000 SV_{34}	—	September 24, 2000	Socorro	LINEAR	·	2.5 km	MPC · JPL
62173	2000 SW_{34}	—	September 24, 2000	Socorro	LINEAR	·	6.3 km	MPC · JPL
62174	2000 SX_{35}	—	September 24, 2000	Socorro	LINEAR	·	3.8 km	MPC · JPL
62175	2000 SZ_{35}	—	September 24, 2000	Socorro	LINEAR	·	2.0 km	MPC · JPL
62176	2000 SJ_{36}	—	September 24, 2000	Socorro	LINEAR	·	3.1 km	MPC · JPL
62177	2000 SG_{37}	—	September 24, 2000	Socorro	LINEAR	·	4.3 km	MPC · JPL
62178	2000 SN_{37}	—	September 24, 2000	Socorro	LINEAR	·	5.0 km	MPC · JPL
62179	2000 SR_{37}	—	September 24, 2000	Socorro	LINEAR	·	3.6 km	MPC · JPL
62180	2000 SA_{38}	—	September 24, 2000	Socorro	LINEAR	EOS	4.2 km	MPC · JPL
62181	2000 SC_{38}	—	September 24, 2000	Socorro	LINEAR	·	4.8 km	MPC · JPL
62182	2000 SD_{38}	—	September 24, 2000	Socorro	LINEAR	·	2.5 km	MPC · JPL
62183	2000 SM_{38}	—	September 24, 2000	Socorro	LINEAR	·	2.8 km	MPC · JPL
62184	2000 SQ_{38}	—	September 24, 2000	Socorro	LINEAR	·	3.9 km	MPC · JPL
62185	2000 SK_{39}	—	September 24, 2000	Socorro	LINEAR	EOS	6.0 km	MPC · JPL
62186	2000 SS_{39}	—	September 24, 2000	Socorro	LINEAR	·	2.4 km	MPC · JPL
62187	2000 SB_{40}	—	September 24, 2000	Socorro	LINEAR	·	4.5 km	MPC · JPL
62188	2000 SK_{41}	—	September 24, 2000	Socorro	LINEAR	·	4.3 km	MPC · JPL
62189	2000 SQ_{41}	—	September 24, 2000	Socorro	LINEAR	EOS	3.9 km	MPC · JPL
62190 Augusthorch	2000 SS_{44}	Augusthorch	September 26, 2000	Drebach	J. Kandler	·	3.5 km	MPC · JPL
62191	2000 SX_{45}	—	September 22, 2000	Socorro	LINEAR	·	3.7 km	MPC · JPL
62192	2000 SL_{46}	—	September 23, 2000	Socorro	LINEAR	EUN ·	3.3 km	MPC · JPL
62193	2000 SS_{47}	—	September 23, 2000	Socorro	LINEAR	·	10 km	MPC · JPL
62194	2000 SV_{47}	—	September 23, 2000	Socorro	LINEAR	·	4.2 km	MPC · JPL
62195	2000 SM_{48}	—	September 23, 2000	Socorro	LINEAR	·	6.2 km	MPC · JPL
62196	2000 SD_{49}	—	September 23, 2000	Socorro	LINEAR	fast	3.2 km	MPC · JPL
62197	2000 SQ_{51}	—	September 23, 2000	Socorro	LINEAR	·	5.2 km	MPC · JPL
62198	2000 SS_{52}	—	September 24, 2000	Socorro	LINEAR	·	3.0 km	MPC · JPL
62199	2000 SC_{53}	—	September 24, 2000	Socorro	LINEAR	EOS	4.8 km	MPC · JPL
62200	2000 SX_{53}	—	September 24, 2000	Socorro	LINEAR	(5)	2.9 km	MPC · JPL

== 62201–62300 ==
back to top

Designation			Discovery			Properties		Ref
Permanent	Provisional	Named after	Date	Site	Discoverer(s)	Category	Diam.	Ref
62201	2000 SW_{54}	—	September 24, 2000	Socorro	LINEAR	L5	19 km	MPC · JPL
62202	2000 SY_{54}	—	September 24, 2000	Socorro	LINEAR	·	4.3 km	MPC · JPL
62203	2000 SA_{55}	—	September 24, 2000	Socorro	LINEAR	·	6.8 km	MPC · JPL
62204	2000 SP_{55}	—	September 24, 2000	Socorro	LINEAR	NEM	5.0 km	MPC · JPL
62205	2000 SQ_{56}	—	September 24, 2000	Socorro	LINEAR	NYS	1.4 km	MPC · JPL
62206	2000 SQ_{58}	—	September 24, 2000	Socorro	LINEAR	THM	5.2 km	MPC · JPL
62207	2000 SX_{58}	—	September 24, 2000	Socorro	LINEAR	·	2.0 km	MPC · JPL
62208	2000 SL_{60}	—	September 24, 2000	Socorro	LINEAR	AGN	2.5 km	MPC · JPL
62209	2000 SF_{61}	—	September 24, 2000	Socorro	LINEAR	·	2.8 km	MPC · JPL
62210	2000 SN_{61}	—	September 24, 2000	Socorro	LINEAR	·	2.7 km	MPC · JPL
62211	2000 SO_{61}	—	September 24, 2000	Socorro	LINEAR	·	4.5 km	MPC · JPL
62212	2000 SA_{62}	—	September 24, 2000	Socorro	LINEAR	·	2.3 km	MPC · JPL
62213	2000 SL_{63}	—	September 24, 2000	Socorro	LINEAR	·	5.3 km	MPC · JPL
62214	2000 SU_{63}	—	September 24, 2000	Socorro	LINEAR	·	2.3 km	MPC · JPL
62215	2000 SY_{63}	—	September 24, 2000	Socorro	LINEAR	·	4.8 km	MPC · JPL
62216	2000 SE_{64}	—	September 24, 2000	Socorro	LINEAR	NYS ·	4.1 km	MPC · JPL
62217	2000 SJ_{64}	—	September 24, 2000	Socorro	LINEAR	EUN	2.2 km	MPC · JPL
62218	2000 SA_{65}	—	September 24, 2000	Socorro	LINEAR	·	2.5 km	MPC · JPL
62219	2000 SY_{65}	—	September 24, 2000	Socorro	LINEAR	·	5.5 km	MPC · JPL
62220	2000 ST_{66}	—	September 24, 2000	Socorro	LINEAR	EOS	5.2 km	MPC · JPL
62221	2000 SA_{67}	—	September 24, 2000	Socorro	LINEAR	·	4.5 km	MPC · JPL
62222	2000 SB_{67}	—	September 24, 2000	Socorro	LINEAR	·	2.6 km	MPC · JPL
62223	2000 SG_{67}	—	September 24, 2000	Socorro	LINEAR	·	4.4 km	MPC · JPL
62224	2000 SJ_{67}	—	September 24, 2000	Socorro	LINEAR	·	2.8 km	MPC · JPL
62225	2000 SZ_{67}	—	September 24, 2000	Socorro	LINEAR	NYS	2.9 km	MPC · JPL
62226	2000 SD_{68}	—	September 24, 2000	Socorro	LINEAR	KOR	3.1 km	MPC · JPL
62227	2000 SQ_{68}	—	September 24, 2000	Socorro	LINEAR	V	1.2 km	MPC · JPL
62228	2000 SK_{69}	—	September 24, 2000	Socorro	LINEAR	MAS	1.7 km	MPC · JPL
62229	2000 SV_{70}	—	September 24, 2000	Socorro	LINEAR	·	3.7 km	MPC · JPL
62230	2000 SN_{71}	—	September 24, 2000	Socorro	LINEAR	HOF	5.7 km	MPC · JPL
62231	2000 SQ_{71}	—	September 24, 2000	Socorro	LINEAR	·	4.1 km	MPC · JPL
62232	2000 SM_{72}	—	September 24, 2000	Socorro	LINEAR	·	2.7 km	MPC · JPL
62233	2000 SP_{72}	—	September 24, 2000	Socorro	LINEAR	EUN	5.0 km	MPC · JPL
62234	2000 SA_{73}	—	September 24, 2000	Socorro	LINEAR	KOR	3.3 km	MPC · JPL
62235	2000 SJ_{73}	—	September 24, 2000	Socorro	LINEAR	·	2.7 km	MPC · JPL
62236	2000 SK_{73}	—	September 24, 2000	Socorro	LINEAR	·	7.3 km	MPC · JPL
62237	2000 SU_{73}	—	September 24, 2000	Socorro	LINEAR	·	2.7 km	MPC · JPL
62238	2000 SF_{74}	—	September 24, 2000	Socorro	LINEAR	·	3.6 km	MPC · JPL
62239	2000 SQ_{74}	—	September 24, 2000	Socorro	LINEAR	GEF	3.4 km	MPC · JPL
62240	2000 SM_{75}	—	September 24, 2000	Socorro	LINEAR	·	2.4 km	MPC · JPL
62241	2000 SW_{75}	—	September 24, 2000	Socorro	LINEAR	T_{j} (2.98) · 3:2	12 km	MPC · JPL
62242	2000 SH_{76}	—	September 24, 2000	Socorro	LINEAR	NYS	2.6 km	MPC · JPL
62243	2000 SO_{76}	—	September 24, 2000	Socorro	LINEAR	EOS	5.6 km	MPC · JPL
62244	2000 SM_{77}	—	September 24, 2000	Socorro	LINEAR	3:2	10 km	MPC · JPL
62245	2000 SQ_{77}	—	September 24, 2000	Socorro	LINEAR	(12739)	3.2 km	MPC · JPL
62246	2000 SK_{78}	—	September 24, 2000	Socorro	LINEAR	·	5.2 km	MPC · JPL
62247	2000 SZ_{78}	—	September 24, 2000	Socorro	LINEAR	·	3.9 km	MPC · JPL
62248	2000 SQ_{79}	—	September 24, 2000	Socorro	LINEAR	·	11 km	MPC · JPL
62249	2000 SU_{79}	—	September 24, 2000	Socorro	LINEAR	·	2.1 km	MPC · JPL
62250	2000 SY_{80}	—	September 24, 2000	Socorro	LINEAR	·	3.3 km	MPC · JPL
62251	2000 SG_{81}	—	September 24, 2000	Socorro	LINEAR	·	3.1 km	MPC · JPL
62252	2000 SW_{82}	—	September 24, 2000	Socorro	LINEAR	·	4.0 km	MPC · JPL
62253	2000 SM_{83}	—	September 24, 2000	Socorro	LINEAR	EOS	3.8 km	MPC · JPL
62254	2000 SR_{83}	—	September 24, 2000	Socorro	LINEAR	·	1.8 km	MPC · JPL
62255	2000 SV_{83}	—	September 24, 2000	Socorro	LINEAR	AST	3.6 km	MPC · JPL
62256	2000 SC_{84}	—	September 24, 2000	Socorro	LINEAR	RAF	1.4 km	MPC · JPL
62257	2000 SH_{85}	—	September 24, 2000	Socorro	LINEAR	·	5.2 km	MPC · JPL
62258	2000 SJ_{85}	—	September 24, 2000	Socorro	LINEAR	·	4.5 km	MPC · JPL
62259	2000 SQ_{85}	—	September 24, 2000	Socorro	LINEAR	HOF	6.0 km	MPC · JPL
62260	2000 SS_{85}	—	September 24, 2000	Socorro	LINEAR	slow	5.9 km	MPC · JPL
62261	2000 SX_{85}	—	September 24, 2000	Socorro	LINEAR	·	2.0 km	MPC · JPL
62262	2000 SO_{86}	—	September 24, 2000	Socorro	LINEAR	·	8.1 km	MPC · JPL
62263	2000 SD_{87}	—	September 24, 2000	Socorro	LINEAR	(5)	3.6 km	MPC · JPL
62264	2000 SA_{88}	—	September 24, 2000	Socorro	LINEAR	·	5.6 km	MPC · JPL
62265	2000 SX_{88}	—	September 25, 2000	Socorro	LINEAR	·	10 km	MPC · JPL
62266	2000 SZ_{88}	—	September 25, 2000	Socorro	LINEAR	V	1.3 km	MPC · JPL
62267	2000 SA_{90}	—	September 22, 2000	Socorro	LINEAR	·	4.9 km	MPC · JPL
62268	2000 SQ_{90}	—	September 22, 2000	Socorro	LINEAR	·	4.6 km	MPC · JPL
62269	2000 SD_{91}	—	September 22, 2000	Socorro	LINEAR	·	17 km	MPC · JPL
62270	2000 SJ_{91}	—	September 23, 2000	Socorro	LINEAR	EOS	3.6 km	MPC · JPL
62271	2000 SC_{93}	—	September 23, 2000	Socorro	LINEAR	·	4.2 km	MPC · JPL
62272	2000 SQ_{96}	—	September 23, 2000	Socorro	LINEAR	·	3.9 km	MPC · JPL
62273	2000 ST_{97}	—	September 23, 2000	Socorro	LINEAR	·	6.8 km	MPC · JPL
62274	2000 SH_{98}	—	September 23, 2000	Socorro	LINEAR	·	4.5 km	MPC · JPL
62275	2000 SK_{98}	—	September 23, 2000	Socorro	LINEAR	EOS	4.4 km	MPC · JPL
62276	2000 SN_{100}	—	September 23, 2000	Socorro	LINEAR	·	3.2 km	MPC · JPL
62277	2000 SX_{100}	—	September 23, 2000	Socorro	LINEAR	·	9.3 km	MPC · JPL
62278	2000 ST_{103}	—	September 24, 2000	Socorro	LINEAR	·	4.6 km	MPC · JPL
62279	2000 SA_{105}	—	September 24, 2000	Socorro	LINEAR	NYS ·	4.4 km	MPC · JPL
62280	2000 SX_{105}	—	September 24, 2000	Socorro	LINEAR	·	1.7 km	MPC · JPL
62281	2000 SD_{106}	—	September 24, 2000	Socorro	LINEAR	·	4.7 km	MPC · JPL
62282	2000 SS_{106}	—	September 24, 2000	Socorro	LINEAR	·	6.0 km	MPC · JPL
62283	2000 SY_{107}	—	September 24, 2000	Socorro	LINEAR	·	3.6 km	MPC · JPL
62284	2000 SD_{108}	—	September 24, 2000	Socorro	LINEAR	·	3.4 km	MPC · JPL
62285	2000 SZ_{109}	—	September 24, 2000	Socorro	LINEAR	V · fast	2.5 km	MPC · JPL
62286	2000 SE_{110}	—	September 24, 2000	Socorro	LINEAR	ERI	4.7 km	MPC · JPL
62287	2000 SG_{110}	—	September 24, 2000	Socorro	LINEAR	THM	8.6 km	MPC · JPL
62288	2000 SH_{110}	—	September 24, 2000	Socorro	LINEAR	NYS ·	2.8 km	MPC · JPL
62289	2000 SX_{110}	—	September 24, 2000	Socorro	LINEAR	NYS	2.5 km	MPC · JPL
62290	2000 SZ_{111}	—	September 24, 2000	Socorro	LINEAR	·	1.8 km	MPC · JPL
62291	2000 SN_{112}	—	September 24, 2000	Socorro	LINEAR	·	3.2 km	MPC · JPL
62292	2000 SO_{113}	—	September 24, 2000	Socorro	LINEAR	·	3.9 km	MPC · JPL
62293	2000 SR_{113}	—	September 24, 2000	Socorro	LINEAR	·	2.6 km	MPC · JPL
62294	2000 ST_{113}	—	September 24, 2000	Socorro	LINEAR	·	4.6 km	MPC · JPL
62295	2000 SV_{114}	—	September 24, 2000	Socorro	LINEAR	·	1.9 km	MPC · JPL
62296	2000 SU_{115}	—	September 24, 2000	Socorro	LINEAR	·	3.1 km	MPC · JPL
62297	2000 SF_{116}	—	September 24, 2000	Socorro	LINEAR	HYG	7.9 km	MPC · JPL
62298	2000 SK_{116}	—	September 24, 2000	Socorro	LINEAR	KOR	3.5 km	MPC · JPL
62299	2000 SN_{116}	—	September 24, 2000	Socorro	LINEAR	·	5.1 km	MPC · JPL
62300	2000 SY_{116}	—	September 24, 2000	Socorro	LINEAR	·	13 km	MPC · JPL

== 62301–62400 ==
back to top

Designation			Discovery			Properties		Ref
Permanent	Provisional	Named after	Date	Site	Discoverer(s)	Category	Diam.	Ref
62301	2000 SE_{117}	—	September 24, 2000	Socorro	LINEAR	NYS	2.8 km	MPC · JPL
62302	2000 SJ_{117}	—	September 24, 2000	Socorro	LINEAR	·	2.9 km	MPC · JPL
62303	2000 SL_{117}	—	September 24, 2000	Socorro	LINEAR	·	8.0 km	MPC · JPL
62304	2000 SM_{117}	—	September 24, 2000	Socorro	LINEAR	·	2.7 km	MPC · JPL
62305	2000 SP_{117}	—	September 24, 2000	Socorro	LINEAR	AGN	2.8 km	MPC · JPL
62306	2000 SS_{117}	—	September 24, 2000	Socorro	LINEAR	·	5.9 km	MPC · JPL
62307	2000 SA_{118}	—	September 24, 2000	Socorro	LINEAR	·	4.4 km	MPC · JPL
62308	2000 SH_{118}	—	September 24, 2000	Socorro	LINEAR	·	8.3 km	MPC · JPL
62309	2000 SL_{118}	—	September 24, 2000	Socorro	LINEAR	·	3.8 km	MPC · JPL
62310	2000 SP_{118}	—	September 24, 2000	Socorro	LINEAR	·	3.4 km	MPC · JPL
62311	2000 SF_{119}	—	September 24, 2000	Socorro	LINEAR	slow	4.8 km	MPC · JPL
62312	2000 SL_{119}	—	September 24, 2000	Socorro	LINEAR	fast	3.9 km	MPC · JPL
62313	2000 SM_{119}	—	September 24, 2000	Socorro	LINEAR	EUN	3.0 km	MPC · JPL
62314	2000 SU_{119}	—	September 24, 2000	Socorro	LINEAR	EOS	5.2 km	MPC · JPL
62315	2000 SV_{119}	—	September 24, 2000	Socorro	LINEAR	NEM	6.5 km	MPC · JPL
62316	2000 SO_{120}	—	September 24, 2000	Socorro	LINEAR	·	5.6 km	MPC · JPL
62317	2000 SU_{121}	—	September 24, 2000	Socorro	LINEAR	NEM · slow	5.1 km	MPC · JPL
62318	2000 SZ_{121}	—	September 24, 2000	Socorro	LINEAR	·	3.5 km	MPC · JPL
62319	2000 SD_{122}	—	September 24, 2000	Socorro	LINEAR	NYS	1.7 km	MPC · JPL
62320	2000 SC_{123}	—	September 24, 2000	Socorro	LINEAR	GEF	2.8 km	MPC · JPL
62321	2000 SP_{123}	—	September 24, 2000	Socorro	LINEAR	·	5.3 km	MPC · JPL
62322	2000 ST_{123}	—	September 24, 2000	Socorro	LINEAR	·	3.3 km	MPC · JPL
62323	2000 SX_{123}	—	September 24, 2000	Socorro	LINEAR	·	4.9 km	MPC · JPL
62324	2000 SY_{123}	—	September 24, 2000	Socorro	LINEAR	·	5.8 km	MPC · JPL
62325	2000 SC_{124}	—	September 24, 2000	Socorro	LINEAR	·	6.9 km	MPC · JPL
62326	2000 SE_{124}	—	September 24, 2000	Socorro	LINEAR	(5)	2.9 km	MPC · JPL
62327	2000 SH_{124}	—	September 24, 2000	Socorro	LINEAR	·	4.8 km	MPC · JPL
62328	2000 SM_{124}	—	September 24, 2000	Socorro	LINEAR	·	3.4 km	MPC · JPL
62329	2000 SN_{124}	—	September 24, 2000	Socorro	LINEAR	(5)	2.7 km	MPC · JPL
62330	2000 SF_{125}	—	September 24, 2000	Socorro	LINEAR	HYG	9.0 km	MPC · JPL
62331	2000 ST_{126}	—	September 24, 2000	Socorro	LINEAR	KOR	3.3 km	MPC · JPL
62332	2000 SX_{126}	—	September 24, 2000	Socorro	LINEAR	PHO	3.5 km	MPC · JPL
62333	2000 SE_{127}	—	September 24, 2000	Socorro	LINEAR	EOS	3.9 km	MPC · JPL
62334	2000 SF_{127}	—	September 24, 2000	Socorro	LINEAR	NYS	1.5 km	MPC · JPL
62335	2000 SJ_{127}	—	September 24, 2000	Socorro	LINEAR	MAS	1.8 km	MPC · JPL
62336	2000 SM_{127}	—	September 24, 2000	Socorro	LINEAR	·	5.6 km	MPC · JPL
62337	2000 SW_{127}	—	September 24, 2000	Socorro	LINEAR	·	3.5 km	MPC · JPL
62338	2000 SN_{128}	—	September 24, 2000	Socorro	LINEAR	·	3.9 km	MPC · JPL
62339	2000 SX_{129}	—	September 22, 2000	Socorro	LINEAR	·	3.5 km	MPC · JPL
62340	2000 SO_{130}	—	September 22, 2000	Socorro	LINEAR	slow	5.3 km	MPC · JPL
62341	2000 SE_{131}	—	September 22, 2000	Socorro	LINEAR	·	3.0 km	MPC · JPL
62342	2000 SD_{132}	—	September 22, 2000	Socorro	LINEAR	·	3.4 km	MPC · JPL
62343	2000 SQ_{132}	—	September 22, 2000	Socorro	LINEAR	HNS	3.3 km	MPC · JPL
62344	2000 SA_{134}	—	September 23, 2000	Socorro	LINEAR	·	3.9 km	MPC · JPL
62345	2000 SW_{134}	—	September 23, 2000	Socorro	LINEAR	EOS	4.0 km	MPC · JPL
62346	2000 SN_{135}	—	September 23, 2000	Socorro	LINEAR	·	6.5 km	MPC · JPL
62347	2000 SL_{138}	—	September 23, 2000	Socorro	LINEAR	·	8.2 km	MPC · JPL
62348	2000 SB_{142}	—	September 23, 2000	Socorro	LINEAR	EOS	5.8 km	MPC · JPL
62349	2000 SH_{142}	—	September 23, 2000	Socorro	LINEAR	EOS	5.4 km	MPC · JPL
62350	2000 SA_{143}	—	September 23, 2000	Socorro	LINEAR	·	3.5 km	MPC · JPL
62351	2000 SB_{143}	—	September 23, 2000	Socorro	LINEAR	·	1.7 km	MPC · JPL
62352	2000 SG_{143}	—	September 23, 2000	Socorro	LINEAR	VER	8.0 km	MPC · JPL
62353	2000 SH_{143}	—	September 23, 2000	Socorro	LINEAR	·	10 km	MPC · JPL
62354	2000 SQ_{143}	—	September 24, 2000	Socorro	LINEAR	EOS · fast	3.7 km	MPC · JPL
62355	2000 SX_{144}	—	September 24, 2000	Socorro	LINEAR	·	4.0 km	MPC · JPL
62356	2000 SG_{146}	—	September 24, 2000	Socorro	LINEAR	AGN	2.6 km	MPC · JPL
62357	2000 SP_{146}	—	September 24, 2000	Socorro	LINEAR	·	3.2 km	MPC · JPL
62358	2000 SY_{147}	—	September 24, 2000	Socorro	LINEAR	·	4.8 km	MPC · JPL
62359	2000 SB_{148}	—	September 24, 2000	Socorro	LINEAR	·	5.8 km	MPC · JPL
62360	2000 SL_{148}	—	September 24, 2000	Socorro	LINEAR	V	1.8 km	MPC · JPL
62361	2000 SX_{148}	—	September 24, 2000	Socorro	LINEAR	NYS	2.5 km	MPC · JPL
62362	2000 SZ_{148}	—	September 24, 2000	Socorro	LINEAR	·	2.6 km	MPC · JPL
62363	2000 SG_{149}	—	September 24, 2000	Socorro	LINEAR	·	3.6 km	MPC · JPL
62364	2000 SN_{149}	—	September 24, 2000	Socorro	LINEAR	·	9.2 km	MPC · JPL
62365	2000 SY_{149}	—	September 24, 2000	Socorro	LINEAR	·	4.1 km	MPC · JPL
62366	2000 SD_{150}	—	September 24, 2000	Socorro	LINEAR	·	2.8 km	MPC · JPL
62367	2000 SF_{150}	—	September 24, 2000	Socorro	LINEAR	·	3.0 km	MPC · JPL
62368	2000 SG_{150}	—	September 24, 2000	Socorro	LINEAR	EOS	3.8 km	MPC · JPL
62369	2000 SK_{150}	—	September 24, 2000	Socorro	LINEAR	·	4.4 km	MPC · JPL
62370	2000 SM_{150}	—	September 24, 2000	Socorro	LINEAR	·	4.2 km	MPC · JPL
62371	2000 SR_{150}	—	September 24, 2000	Socorro	LINEAR	·	3.3 km	MPC · JPL
62372	2000 SX_{150}	—	September 24, 2000	Socorro	LINEAR	·	5.5 km	MPC · JPL
62373	2000 SE_{151}	—	September 24, 2000	Socorro	LINEAR	·	5.8 km	MPC · JPL
62374	2000 SW_{151}	—	September 24, 2000	Socorro	LINEAR	(21885)	8.6 km	MPC · JPL
62375	2000 SG_{152}	—	September 24, 2000	Socorro	LINEAR	·	2.2 km	MPC · JPL
62376	2000 SU_{153}	—	September 24, 2000	Socorro	LINEAR	TEL	3.5 km	MPC · JPL
62377	2000 SJ_{154}	—	September 24, 2000	Socorro	LINEAR	EUN	3.7 km	MPC · JPL
62378	2000 SN_{154}	—	September 24, 2000	Socorro	LINEAR	NYS	2.9 km	MPC · JPL
62379	2000 SA_{155}	—	September 24, 2000	Socorro	LINEAR	EOS	5.2 km	MPC · JPL
62380	2000 SF_{155}	—	September 24, 2000	Socorro	LINEAR	·	9.0 km	MPC · JPL
62381	2000 SO_{155}	—	September 24, 2000	Socorro	LINEAR	·	9.3 km	MPC · JPL
62382	2000 SM_{156}	—	September 24, 2000	Socorro	LINEAR	·	6.6 km	MPC · JPL
62383	2000 SS_{156}	—	September 24, 2000	Socorro	LINEAR	EOS	4.3 km	MPC · JPL
62384	2000 SX_{156}	—	September 26, 2000	Socorro	LINEAR	·	7.0 km	MPC · JPL
62385	2000 ST_{157}	—	September 27, 2000	Socorro	LINEAR	·	4.0 km	MPC · JPL
62386	2000 SR_{161}	—	September 20, 2000	Haleakala	NEAT	·	5.5 km	MPC · JPL
62387	2000 SQ_{162}	—	September 22, 2000	Haleakala	NEAT	MAR	2.8 km	MPC · JPL
62388	2000 SW_{162}	—	September 30, 2000	Elmira	Cecce, A. J.	·	3.9 km	MPC · JPL
62389	2000 SE_{165}	—	September 23, 2000	Socorro	LINEAR	EUN	5.1 km	MPC · JPL
62390	2000 SA_{166}	—	September 23, 2000	Socorro	LINEAR	MAR	4.6 km	MPC · JPL
62391	2000 SK_{167}	—	September 23, 2000	Socorro	LINEAR	·	6.1 km	MPC · JPL
62392	2000 SW_{168}	—	September 23, 2000	Socorro	LINEAR	RAF	4.0 km	MPC · JPL
62393	2000 SM_{169}	—	September 24, 2000	Socorro	LINEAR	·	3.5 km	MPC · JPL
62394	2000 SU_{169}	—	September 24, 2000	Socorro	LINEAR	MAR	4.3 km	MPC · JPL
62395	2000 SZ_{169}	—	September 24, 2000	Socorro	LINEAR	MAR	3.3 km	MPC · JPL
62396	2000 SE_{170}	—	September 24, 2000	Socorro	LINEAR	EUN	5.2 km	MPC · JPL
62397	2000 SM_{170}	—	September 24, 2000	Socorro	LINEAR	BRA	5.0 km	MPC · JPL
62398	2000 SR_{170}	—	September 24, 2000	Socorro	LINEAR	·	5.2 km	MPC · JPL
62399	2000 SV_{170}	—	September 24, 2000	Socorro	LINEAR	·	2.6 km	MPC · JPL
62400	2000 SA_{171}	—	September 24, 2000	Socorro	LINEAR	·	3.0 km	MPC · JPL

== 62401–62500 ==
back to top

Designation			Discovery			Properties		Ref
Permanent	Provisional	Named after	Date	Site	Discoverer(s)	Category	Diam.	Ref
62401	2000 SD_{171}	—	September 24, 2000	Socorro	LINEAR	·	2.2 km	MPC · JPL
62402	2000 SM_{171}	—	September 24, 2000	Socorro	LINEAR	·	4.4 km	MPC · JPL
62403	2000 SL_{172}	—	September 27, 2000	Socorro	LINEAR	·	7.5 km	MPC · JPL
62404	2000 SQ_{173}	—	September 28, 2000	Socorro	LINEAR	MAR · slow	4.1 km	MPC · JPL
62405	2000 SR_{175}	—	September 28, 2000	Socorro	LINEAR	EOS	6.0 km	MPC · JPL
62406	2000 SN_{176}	—	September 28, 2000	Socorro	LINEAR	V	3.0 km	MPC · JPL
62407	2000 SO_{176}	—	September 28, 2000	Socorro	LINEAR	·	1.9 km	MPC · JPL
62408	2000 SU_{176}	—	September 28, 2000	Socorro	LINEAR	HIL · 3:2 · (6124)	12 km	MPC · JPL
62409	2000 SR_{177}	—	September 28, 2000	Socorro	LINEAR	EOS	5.6 km	MPC · JPL
62410	2000 SN_{178}	—	September 28, 2000	Socorro	LINEAR	·	4.8 km	MPC · JPL
62411	2000 SX_{178}	—	September 28, 2000	Socorro	LINEAR	V	2.2 km	MPC · JPL
62412	2000 SY_{178}	—	September 28, 2000	Socorro	LINEAR	HYG	10 km	MPC · JPL
62413	2000 SE_{179}	—	September 28, 2000	Socorro	LINEAR	·	6.8 km	MPC · JPL
62414	2000 SV_{179}	—	September 28, 2000	Socorro	LINEAR	·	2.2 km	MPC · JPL
62415	2000 SA_{180}	—	September 28, 2000	Socorro	LINEAR	·	5.7 km	MPC · JPL
62416	2000 SS_{180}	—	September 28, 2000	Socorro	LINEAR	·	4.8 km	MPC · JPL
62417	2000 ST_{181}	—	September 19, 2000	Haleakala	NEAT	·	5.8 km	MPC · JPL
62418	2000 SR_{182}	—	September 20, 2000	Socorro	LINEAR	WAT	4.3 km	MPC · JPL
62419	2000 SX_{183}	—	September 20, 2000	Haleakala	NEAT	·	3.9 km	MPC · JPL
62420	2000 SH_{184}	—	September 20, 2000	Haleakala	NEAT	·	2.8 km	MPC · JPL
62421	2000 SJ_{184}	—	September 20, 2000	Haleakala	NEAT	·	4.0 km	MPC · JPL
62422	2000 SK_{184}	—	September 20, 2000	Haleakala	NEAT	V	1.5 km	MPC · JPL
62423	2000 SM_{184}	—	September 20, 2000	Haleakala	NEAT	TEL	3.3 km	MPC · JPL
62424	2000 SX_{184}	—	September 20, 2000	Haleakala	NEAT	·	9.0 km	MPC · JPL
62425	2000 SM_{186}	—	September 21, 2000	Haleakala	NEAT	EOS	5.4 km	MPC · JPL
62426	2000 SX_{186}	—	September 21, 2000	Haleakala	NEAT	L5	26 km	MPC · JPL
62427	2000 SH_{187}	—	September 21, 2000	Haleakala	NEAT	·	4.6 km	MPC · JPL
62428	2000 SM_{187}	—	September 21, 2000	Haleakala	NEAT	·	2.3 km	MPC · JPL
62429	2000 SQ_{187}	—	September 21, 2000	Haleakala	NEAT	·	6.2 km	MPC · JPL
62430	2000 SV_{187}	—	September 21, 2000	Haleakala	NEAT	·	11 km	MPC · JPL
62431	2000 SG_{188}	—	September 21, 2000	Haleakala	NEAT	·	5.7 km	MPC · JPL
62432	2000 SH_{188}	—	September 21, 2000	Haleakala	NEAT	THM	8.7 km	MPC · JPL
62433	2000 SO_{188}	—	September 21, 2000	Haleakala	NEAT	NYS	2.9 km	MPC · JPL
62434	2000 SW_{189}	—	September 22, 2000	Haleakala	NEAT	·	7.7 km	MPC · JPL
62435	2000 SN_{190}	—	September 23, 2000	Socorro	LINEAR	·	4.4 km	MPC · JPL
62436	2000 SR_{192}	—	September 24, 2000	Socorro	LINEAR	EOS	4.5 km	MPC · JPL
62437	2000 SY_{198}	—	September 24, 2000	Socorro	LINEAR	·	4.4 km	MPC · JPL
62438	2000 SF_{199}	—	September 24, 2000	Socorro	LINEAR	·	3.2 km	MPC · JPL
62439	2000 SK_{200}	—	September 24, 2000	Socorro	LINEAR	·	4.2 km	MPC · JPL
62440	2000 SR_{201}	—	September 24, 2000	Socorro	LINEAR	·	3.3 km	MPC · JPL
62441	2000 SX_{202}	—	September 24, 2000	Socorro	LINEAR	KOR	2.9 km	MPC · JPL
62442	2000 SA_{204}	—	September 24, 2000	Socorro	LINEAR	·	3.9 km	MPC · JPL
62443	2000 SN_{204}	—	September 24, 2000	Socorro	LINEAR	NYS	2.4 km	MPC · JPL
62444	2000 SO_{206}	—	September 24, 2000	Socorro	LINEAR	(21344)	3.1 km	MPC · JPL
62445	2000 SF_{207}	—	September 24, 2000	Socorro	LINEAR	·	2.8 km	MPC · JPL
62446	2000 SH_{207}	—	September 24, 2000	Socorro	LINEAR	AGN	3.2 km	MPC · JPL
62447	2000 SR_{207}	—	September 24, 2000	Socorro	LINEAR	·	1.5 km	MPC · JPL
62448	2000 SC_{208}	—	September 24, 2000	Socorro	LINEAR	·	2.8 km	MPC · JPL
62449	2000 SD_{208}	—	September 24, 2000	Socorro	LINEAR	MRX	2.2 km	MPC · JPL
62450	2000 SE_{208}	—	September 24, 2000	Socorro	LINEAR	·	4.8 km	MPC · JPL
62451	2000 SN_{208}	—	September 25, 2000	Socorro	LINEAR	·	2.9 km	MPC · JPL
62452	2000 SO_{209}	—	September 25, 2000	Socorro	LINEAR	·	6.3 km	MPC · JPL
62453	2000 SP_{209}	—	September 25, 2000	Socorro	LINEAR	·	4.6 km	MPC · JPL
62454	2000 SQ_{209}	—	September 25, 2000	Socorro	LINEAR	EOS	5.8 km	MPC · JPL
62455	2000 SK_{210}	—	September 25, 2000	Socorro	LINEAR	·	1.8 km	MPC · JPL
62456	2000 SL_{210}	—	September 25, 2000	Socorro	LINEAR	EOS	5.8 km	MPC · JPL
62457	2000 SO_{210}	—	September 25, 2000	Socorro	LINEAR	·	2.6 km	MPC · JPL
62458	2000 SP_{211}	—	September 25, 2000	Socorro	LINEAR	ADE	6.1 km	MPC · JPL
62459	2000 SX_{211}	—	September 25, 2000	Socorro	LINEAR	DOR	5.4 km	MPC · JPL
62460	2000 SY_{211}	—	September 25, 2000	Socorro	LINEAR	·	3.2 km	MPC · JPL
62461	2000 SH_{212}	—	September 25, 2000	Socorro	LINEAR	·	5.0 km	MPC · JPL
62462	2000 SO_{212}	—	September 25, 2000	Socorro	LINEAR	·	3.5 km	MPC · JPL
62463	2000 SS_{212}	—	September 25, 2000	Socorro	LINEAR	·	3.5 km	MPC · JPL
62464	2000 SF_{213}	—	September 25, 2000	Socorro	LINEAR	·	4.7 km	MPC · JPL
62465	2000 SJ_{213}	—	September 25, 2000	Socorro	LINEAR	EOS	5.0 km	MPC · JPL
62466	2000 SR_{213}	—	September 25, 2000	Socorro	LINEAR	·	8.0 km	MPC · JPL
62467	2000 SW_{213}	—	September 25, 2000	Socorro	LINEAR	VER	7.5 km	MPC · JPL
62468	2000 SA_{214}	—	September 25, 2000	Socorro	LINEAR	·	6.6 km	MPC · JPL
62469	2000 SD_{215}	—	September 26, 2000	Socorro	LINEAR	·	3.4 km	MPC · JPL
62470	2000 SH_{216}	—	September 26, 2000	Socorro	LINEAR	·	10 km	MPC · JPL
62471	2000 SP_{216}	—	September 26, 2000	Socorro	LINEAR	·	2.3 km	MPC · JPL
62472	2000 SO_{217}	—	September 26, 2000	Socorro	LINEAR	DOR	6.3 km	MPC · JPL
62473	2000 SZ_{217}	—	September 26, 2000	Socorro	LINEAR	EOS	5.1 km	MPC · JPL
62474	2000 SP_{218}	—	September 26, 2000	Socorro	LINEAR	DOR	7.1 km	MPC · JPL
62475	2000 SB_{219}	—	September 26, 2000	Socorro	LINEAR	·	11 km	MPC · JPL
62476	2000 SH_{219}	—	September 26, 2000	Socorro	LINEAR	·	6.6 km	MPC · JPL
62477	2000 SJ_{219}	—	September 26, 2000	Socorro	LINEAR	·	6.0 km	MPC · JPL
62478	2000 SK_{219}	—	September 26, 2000	Socorro	LINEAR	·	5.0 km	MPC · JPL
62479	2000 SD_{220}	—	September 26, 2000	Socorro	LINEAR	·	5.2 km	MPC · JPL
62480	2000 SU_{220}	—	September 26, 2000	Socorro	LINEAR	LIX	7.5 km	MPC · JPL
62481	2000 SC_{221}	—	September 26, 2000	Socorro	LINEAR	·	8.8 km	MPC · JPL
62482	2000 SE_{221}	—	September 26, 2000	Socorro	LINEAR	·	5.2 km	MPC · JPL
62483	2000 SG_{221}	—	September 26, 2000	Socorro	LINEAR	CYB	10 km	MPC · JPL
62484	2000 SN_{221}	—	September 26, 2000	Socorro	LINEAR	GEF	3.6 km	MPC · JPL
62485	2000 SX_{221}	—	September 26, 2000	Socorro	LINEAR	·	6.9 km	MPC · JPL
62486	2000 SC_{222}	—	September 26, 2000	Socorro	LINEAR	·	4.0 km	MPC · JPL
62487	2000 SP_{222}	—	September 26, 2000	Socorro	LINEAR	GEF	2.3 km	MPC · JPL
62488	2000 SN_{223}	—	September 27, 2000	Socorro	LINEAR	HOF	4.4 km	MPC · JPL
62489	2000 SS_{223}	—	September 27, 2000	Socorro	LINEAR	3:2 · SHU	9.7 km	MPC · JPL
62490	2000 SL_{224}	—	September 27, 2000	Socorro	LINEAR	·	4.6 km	MPC · JPL
62491	2000 SN_{224}	—	September 27, 2000	Socorro	LINEAR	·	3.0 km	MPC · JPL
62492	2000 ST_{224}	—	September 27, 2000	Socorro	LINEAR	·	7.0 km	MPC · JPL
62493	2000 SK_{225}	—	September 27, 2000	Socorro	LINEAR	·	4.5 km	MPC · JPL
62494	2000 SP_{225}	—	September 27, 2000	Socorro	LINEAR	·	5.1 km	MPC · JPL
62495	2000 SQ_{226}	—	September 27, 2000	Socorro	LINEAR	·	2.3 km	MPC · JPL
62496	2000 SA_{227}	—	September 27, 2000	Socorro	LINEAR	EUN	3.5 km	MPC · JPL
62497	2000 SJ_{228}	—	September 28, 2000	Socorro	LINEAR	·	3.9 km	MPC · JPL
62498	2000 SL_{228}	—	September 28, 2000	Socorro	LINEAR	·	5.1 km	MPC · JPL
62499	2000 SK_{229}	—	September 28, 2000	Socorro	LINEAR	·	2.2 km	MPC · JPL
62500	2000 SL_{229}	—	September 28, 2000	Socorro	LINEAR	·	3.3 km	MPC · JPL

== 62501–62600 ==
back to top

Designation			Discovery			Properties		Ref
Permanent	Provisional	Named after	Date	Site	Discoverer(s)	Category	Diam.	Ref
62501	2000 SP_{229}	—	September 28, 2000	Socorro	LINEAR	·	4.4 km	MPC · JPL
62502	2000 SZ_{229}	—	September 28, 2000	Socorro	LINEAR	·	3.4 km	MPC · JPL
62503 Tomcave	2000 SL_{233}	Tomcave	September 30, 2000	Anza	M. Collins, White, M.	·	4.5 km	MPC · JPL
62504	2000 SZ_{233}	—	September 21, 2000	Socorro	LINEAR	·	8.0 km	MPC · JPL
62505	2000 SF_{234}	—	September 21, 2000	Socorro	LINEAR	·	5.0 km	MPC · JPL
62506	2000 SJ_{234}	—	September 21, 2000	Socorro	LINEAR	EOS	5.5 km	MPC · JPL
62507	2000 SL_{235}	—	September 24, 2000	Socorro	LINEAR	·	3.7 km	MPC · JPL
62508	2000 SV_{235}	—	September 24, 2000	Socorro	LINEAR	EOS	4.4 km	MPC · JPL
62509	2000 SH_{237}	—	September 24, 2000	Socorro	LINEAR	·	2.0 km	MPC · JPL
62510	2000 SW_{237}	—	September 25, 2000	Socorro	LINEAR	·	5.8 km	MPC · JPL
62511	2000 SU_{239}	—	September 28, 2000	Socorro	LINEAR	·	1.8 km	MPC · JPL
62512	2000 SF_{241}	—	September 23, 2000	Socorro	LINEAR	VER	5.7 km	MPC · JPL
62513	2000 SL_{241}	—	September 24, 2000	Socorro	LINEAR	·	2.2 km	MPC · JPL
62514	2000 SX_{241}	—	September 24, 2000	Socorro	LINEAR	·	2.6 km	MPC · JPL
62515	2000 SX_{242}	—	September 24, 2000	Socorro	LINEAR	(5)	2.9 km	MPC · JPL
62516	2000 SN_{243}	—	September 24, 2000	Socorro	LINEAR	AGN	2.5 km	MPC · JPL
62517	2000 SY_{244}	—	September 24, 2000	Socorro	LINEAR	·	4.4 km	MPC · JPL
62518	2000 SM_{245}	—	September 24, 2000	Socorro	LINEAR	GEF	3.4 km	MPC · JPL
62519	2000 SX_{246}	—	September 24, 2000	Socorro	LINEAR	·	1.4 km	MPC · JPL
62520	2000 SV_{247}	—	September 24, 2000	Socorro	LINEAR	·	3.1 km	MPC · JPL
62521	2000 SW_{247}	—	September 24, 2000	Socorro	LINEAR	·	1.6 km	MPC · JPL
62522	2000 SL_{248}	—	September 24, 2000	Socorro	LINEAR	·	2.3 km	MPC · JPL
62523	2000 SW_{249}	—	September 24, 2000	Socorro	LINEAR	·	3.5 km	MPC · JPL
62524	2000 SL_{250}	—	September 24, 2000	Socorro	LINEAR	EOS	4.2 km	MPC · JPL
62525	2000 SD_{251}	—	September 24, 2000	Socorro	LINEAR	·	3.9 km	MPC · JPL
62526	2000 SS_{251}	—	September 24, 2000	Socorro	LINEAR	EOS	4.7 km	MPC · JPL
62527	2000 SV_{251}	—	September 24, 2000	Socorro	LINEAR	HOF	5.2 km	MPC · JPL
62528	2000 SG_{252}	—	September 24, 2000	Socorro	LINEAR	EOS	3.6 km	MPC · JPL
62529	2000 SA_{253}	—	September 24, 2000	Socorro	LINEAR	·	3.4 km	MPC · JPL
62530	2000 SU_{253}	—	September 24, 2000	Socorro	LINEAR	·	3.0 km	MPC · JPL
62531	2000 SH_{254}	—	September 24, 2000	Socorro	LINEAR	·	2.3 km	MPC · JPL
62532	2000 ST_{254}	—	September 24, 2000	Socorro	LINEAR	·	5.1 km	MPC · JPL
62533	2000 SN_{255}	—	September 24, 2000	Socorro	LINEAR	·	1.8 km	MPC · JPL
62534	2000 SR_{255}	—	September 24, 2000	Socorro	LINEAR	KOR	3.2 km	MPC · JPL
62535	2000 SU_{257}	—	September 24, 2000	Socorro	LINEAR	EOS	5.2 km	MPC · JPL
62536	2000 SZ_{257}	—	September 24, 2000	Socorro	LINEAR	·	3.6 km	MPC · JPL
62537	2000 SG_{258}	—	September 24, 2000	Socorro	LINEAR	AGN · slow	2.8 km	MPC · JPL
62538	2000 SS_{258}	—	September 24, 2000	Socorro	LINEAR	·	3.9 km	MPC · JPL
62539	2000 SR_{259}	—	September 24, 2000	Socorro	LINEAR	EOS	5.2 km	MPC · JPL
62540	2000 SX_{259}	—	September 24, 2000	Socorro	LINEAR	·	4.8 km	MPC · JPL
62541	2000 SY_{259}	—	September 24, 2000	Socorro	LINEAR	EUN	4.0 km	MPC · JPL
62542	2000 SO_{260}	—	September 24, 2000	Socorro	LINEAR	·	3.2 km	MPC · JPL
62543	2000 SW_{260}	—	September 24, 2000	Socorro	LINEAR	·	4.3 km	MPC · JPL
62544	2000 SD_{261}	—	September 24, 2000	Socorro	LINEAR	EOS	5.3 km	MPC · JPL
62545	2000 ST_{261}	—	September 24, 2000	Socorro	LINEAR	·	3.0 km	MPC · JPL
62546	2000 SV_{261}	—	September 24, 2000	Socorro	LINEAR	·	2.3 km	MPC · JPL
62547	2000 SW_{261}	—	September 24, 2000	Socorro	LINEAR	·	4.8 km	MPC · JPL
62548	2000 SB_{262}	—	September 25, 2000	Socorro	LINEAR	·	1.6 km	MPC · JPL
62549	2000 SZ_{262}	—	September 25, 2000	Socorro	LINEAR	·	2.9 km	MPC · JPL
62550	2000 SM_{263}	—	September 26, 2000	Socorro	LINEAR	·	5.1 km	MPC · JPL
62551	2000 SP_{263}	—	September 26, 2000	Socorro	LINEAR	·	8.2 km	MPC · JPL
62552	2000 SL_{264}	—	September 26, 2000	Socorro	LINEAR	KOR	3.1 km	MPC · JPL
62553	2000 SQ_{264}	—	September 26, 2000	Socorro	LINEAR	NYS	2.8 km	MPC · JPL
62554	2000 SR_{264}	—	September 26, 2000	Socorro	LINEAR	·	5.1 km	MPC · JPL
62555	2000 SE_{265}	—	September 26, 2000	Socorro	LINEAR	·	3.6 km	MPC · JPL
62556	2000 SB_{266}	—	September 26, 2000	Socorro	LINEAR	·	3.1 km	MPC · JPL
62557	2000 SP_{267}	—	September 27, 2000	Socorro	LINEAR	PAD	3.0 km	MPC · JPL
62558	2000 SD_{268}	—	September 27, 2000	Socorro	LINEAR	·	2.0 km	MPC · JPL
62559	2000 SP_{268}	—	September 27, 2000	Socorro	LINEAR	MAS	1.8 km	MPC · JPL
62560	2000 SZ_{268}	—	September 27, 2000	Socorro	LINEAR	·	6.0 km	MPC · JPL
62561	2000 SF_{269}	—	September 27, 2000	Socorro	LINEAR	slow	5.5 km	MPC · JPL
62562	2000 SR_{269}	—	September 27, 2000	Socorro	LINEAR	·	2.7 km	MPC · JPL
62563	2000 SS_{270}	—	September 27, 2000	Socorro	LINEAR	·	3.7 km	MPC · JPL
62564	2000 SJ_{271}	—	September 27, 2000	Socorro	LINEAR	(5)	2.8 km	MPC · JPL
62565	2000 SU_{272}	—	September 28, 2000	Socorro	LINEAR	·	4.9 km	MPC · JPL
62566	2000 SA_{274}	—	September 28, 2000	Socorro	LINEAR	·	3.4 km	MPC · JPL
62567	2000 SJ_{274}	—	September 28, 2000	Socorro	LINEAR	·	3.8 km	MPC · JPL
62568	2000 SM_{274}	—	September 28, 2000	Socorro	LINEAR	·	2.7 km	MPC · JPL
62569	2000 SR_{274}	—	September 28, 2000	Socorro	LINEAR	PAD	5.2 km	MPC · JPL
62570	2000 SX_{274}	—	September 28, 2000	Socorro	LINEAR	·	3.1 km	MPC · JPL
62571	2000 SY_{274}	—	September 28, 2000	Socorro	LINEAR	AGN	6.4 km	MPC · JPL
62572	2000 SC_{276}	—	September 28, 2000	Socorro	LINEAR	·	1.6 km	MPC · JPL
62573	2000 SR_{276}	—	September 30, 2000	Socorro	LINEAR	·	7.6 km	MPC · JPL
62574	2000 SF_{277}	—	September 30, 2000	Socorro	LINEAR	·	3.3 km	MPC · JPL
62575	2000 SL_{278}	—	September 30, 2000	Socorro	LINEAR	EUN	4.4 km	MPC · JPL
62576	2000 ST_{278}	—	September 30, 2000	Socorro	LINEAR	EOS	4.5 km	MPC · JPL
62577	2000 SU_{279}	—	September 25, 2000	Socorro	LINEAR	·	3.1 km	MPC · JPL
62578	2000 SA_{280}	—	September 27, 2000	Socorro	LINEAR	·	3.8 km	MPC · JPL
62579	2000 SA_{281}	—	September 23, 2000	Socorro	LINEAR	EUN	3.2 km	MPC · JPL
62580	2000 SD_{281}	—	September 23, 2000	Socorro	LINEAR	EOS	4.6 km	MPC · JPL
62581	2000 SL_{282}	—	September 23, 2000	Socorro	LINEAR	·	3.8 km	MPC · JPL
62582	2000 SO_{289}	—	September 27, 2000	Socorro	LINEAR	·	5.1 km	MPC · JPL
62583	2000 SJ_{293}	—	September 27, 2000	Socorro	LINEAR	·	7.5 km	MPC · JPL
62584	2000 SP_{293}	—	September 27, 2000	Socorro	LINEAR	·	8.9 km	MPC · JPL
62585	2000 SR_{293}	—	September 27, 2000	Socorro	LINEAR	·	9.8 km	MPC · JPL
62586	2000 SN_{297}	—	September 28, 2000	Socorro	LINEAR	EOS	4.5 km	MPC · JPL
62587	2000 ST_{299}	—	September 28, 2000	Socorro	LINEAR	VER	6.9 km	MPC · JPL
62588	2000 SE_{301}	—	September 28, 2000	Socorro	LINEAR	HYG	6.3 km	MPC · JPL
62589	2000 SA_{302}	—	September 28, 2000	Socorro	LINEAR	EOS	4.6 km	MPC · JPL
62590	2000 SB_{303}	—	September 28, 2000	Socorro	LINEAR	·	5.4 km	MPC · JPL
62591	2000 ST_{303}	—	September 28, 2000	Socorro	LINEAR	·	2.7 km	MPC · JPL
62592	2000 SA_{304}	—	September 30, 2000	Socorro	LINEAR	EUN	2.8 km	MPC · JPL
62593	2000 SD_{305}	—	September 30, 2000	Socorro	LINEAR	·	8.0 km	MPC · JPL
62594	2000 SX_{305}	—	September 30, 2000	Socorro	LINEAR	EOS	4.6 km	MPC · JPL
62595	2000 SW_{306}	—	September 30, 2000	Socorro	LINEAR	·	4.1 km	MPC · JPL
62596	2000 SL_{309}	—	September 30, 2000	Socorro	LINEAR	MAR	3.7 km	MPC · JPL
62597	2000 SB_{311}	—	September 26, 2000	Socorro	LINEAR	·	6.3 km	MPC · JPL
62598	2000 SW_{313}	—	September 27, 2000	Socorro	LINEAR	EUN	4.0 km	MPC · JPL
62599	2000 SA_{318}	—	September 30, 2000	Socorro	LINEAR	·	2.7 km	MPC · JPL
62600	2000 SG_{318}	—	September 29, 2000	Haleakala	NEAT	MAR	2.2 km	MPC · JPL

== 62601–62700 ==
back to top

Designation			Discovery			Properties		Ref
Permanent	Provisional	Named after	Date	Site	Discoverer(s)	Category	Diam.	Ref
62601	2000 SH_{318}	—	September 29, 2000	Haleakala	NEAT	·	2.7 km	MPC · JPL
62602	2000 SJ_{318}	—	September 29, 2000	Haleakala	NEAT	·	3.2 km	MPC · JPL
62603	2000 SD_{320}	—	September 28, 2000	Kitt Peak	Spacewatch	·	4.9 km	MPC · JPL
62604	2000 SU_{320}	—	September 30, 2000	Socorro	LINEAR	VER	9.4 km	MPC · JPL
62605	2000 SV_{320}	—	September 30, 2000	Socorro	LINEAR	EOS ·	5.9 km	MPC · JPL
62606	2000 SK_{325}	—	September 29, 2000	Kitt Peak	Spacewatch	·	6.5 km	MPC · JPL
62607	2000 SZ_{330}	—	September 27, 2000	Kitt Peak	Spacewatch	·	6.6 km	MPC · JPL
62608	2000 SD_{332}	—	September 23, 2000	Mauna Kea	B. Gladman	THM	6.8 km	MPC · JPL
62609	2000 SF_{333}	—	September 26, 2000	Kitt Peak	Spacewatch	HOF	5.8 km	MPC · JPL
62610	2000 SV_{333}	—	September 26, 2000	Haleakala	NEAT	EOS	5.6 km	MPC · JPL
62611	2000 SX_{334}	—	September 26, 2000	Haleakala	NEAT	·	3.6 km	MPC · JPL
62612	2000 SQ_{335}	—	September 26, 2000	Haleakala	NEAT	·	7.7 km	MPC · JPL
62613	2000 SF_{336}	—	September 26, 2000	Haleakala	NEAT	(31811)	4.6 km	MPC · JPL
62614	2000 SS_{339}	—	September 25, 2000	Kitt Peak	Spacewatch	·	2.3 km	MPC · JPL
62615	2000 SA_{340}	—	September 25, 2000	Haleakala	NEAT	·	3.5 km	MPC · JPL
62616	2000 SF_{343}	—	September 24, 2000	Socorro	LINEAR	KOR	3.0 km	MPC · JPL
62617	2000 SW_{344}	—	September 20, 2000	Socorro	LINEAR	MAR	3.0 km	MPC · JPL
62618	2000 SD_{348}	—	September 20, 2000	Socorro	LINEAR	·	5.0 km	MPC · JPL
62619	2000 SE_{348}	—	September 20, 2000	Socorro	LINEAR	·	4.1 km	MPC · JPL
62620	2000 SA_{350}	—	September 29, 2000	Anderson Mesa	LONEOS	·	7.7 km	MPC · JPL
62621	2000 SC_{350}	—	September 29, 2000	Anderson Mesa	LONEOS	·	4.0 km	MPC · JPL
62622	2000 SQ_{350}	—	September 29, 2000	Anderson Mesa	LONEOS	·	4.1 km	MPC · JPL
62623	2000 SS_{350}	—	September 29, 2000	Anderson Mesa	LONEOS	ADE	6.8 km	MPC · JPL
62624	2000 SX_{350}	—	September 29, 2000	Anderson Mesa	LONEOS	·	3.5 km	MPC · JPL
62625	2000 SG_{351}	—	September 29, 2000	Anderson Mesa	LONEOS	EUN	3.1 km	MPC · JPL
62626	2000 SK_{351}	—	September 29, 2000	Anderson Mesa	LONEOS	ADE	5.7 km	MPC · JPL
62627	2000 SH_{352}	—	September 30, 2000	Anderson Mesa	LONEOS	·	3.0 km	MPC · JPL
62628	2000 SL_{352}	—	September 30, 2000	Anderson Mesa	LONEOS	·	6.0 km	MPC · JPL
62629	2000 SO_{354}	—	September 29, 2000	Anderson Mesa	LONEOS	·	9.2 km	MPC · JPL
62630	2000 SZ_{354}	—	September 29, 2000	Anderson Mesa	LONEOS	EOS	4.4 km	MPC · JPL
62631	2000 SM_{355}	—	September 29, 2000	Anderson Mesa	LONEOS	·	4.0 km	MPC · JPL
62632	2000 SB_{356}	—	September 29, 2000	Anderson Mesa	LONEOS	·	4.9 km	MPC · JPL
62633	2000 SC_{356}	—	September 29, 2000	Anderson Mesa	LONEOS	·	7.6 km	MPC · JPL
62634	2000 SL_{356}	—	September 29, 2000	Anderson Mesa	LONEOS	·	4.2 km	MPC · JPL
62635	2000 SO_{356}	—	September 29, 2000	Anderson Mesa	LONEOS	·	4.7 km	MPC · JPL
62636	2000 SX_{356}	—	September 28, 2000	Anderson Mesa	LONEOS	V	1.6 km	MPC · JPL
62637	2000 SZ_{356}	—	September 28, 2000	Anderson Mesa	LONEOS	·	3.0 km	MPC · JPL
62638	2000 SJ_{357}	—	September 28, 2000	Anderson Mesa	LONEOS	·	3.7 km	MPC · JPL
62639	2000 SS_{357}	—	September 28, 2000	Anderson Mesa	LONEOS	·	3.5 km	MPC · JPL
62640	2000 SR_{358}	—	September 24, 2000	Haleakala	NEAT	·	7.0 km	MPC · JPL
62641	2000 SZ_{358}	—	September 25, 2000	Haleakala	NEAT	·	4.1 km	MPC · JPL
62642	2000 SN_{359}	—	September 26, 2000	Anderson Mesa	LONEOS	·	11 km	MPC · JPL
62643	2000 SH_{360}	—	September 26, 2000	Haleakala	NEAT	·	7.2 km	MPC · JPL
62644	2000 SP_{360}	—	September 26, 2000	Haleakala	NEAT	·	6.4 km	MPC · JPL
62645	2000 SW_{360}	—	September 22, 2000	Anderson Mesa	LONEOS	HOF	5.4 km	MPC · JPL
62646	2000 SO_{361}	—	September 23, 2000	Anderson Mesa	LONEOS	·	3.3 km	MPC · JPL
62647	2000 SY_{362}	—	September 20, 2000	Haleakala	NEAT	·	3.6 km	MPC · JPL
62648	2000 SC_{363}	—	September 19, 2000	Anderson Mesa	LONEOS	·	3.0 km	MPC · JPL
62649	2000 SS_{363}	—	September 20, 2000	Socorro	LINEAR	·	4.4 km	MPC · JPL
62650	2000 SV_{363}	—	September 20, 2000	Socorro	LINEAR	·	3.3 km	MPC · JPL
62651	2000 SB_{364}	—	September 20, 2000	Socorro	LINEAR	EOS	5.1 km	MPC · JPL
62652	2000 SC_{364}	—	September 20, 2000	Socorro	LINEAR	V	1.9 km	MPC · JPL
62653	2000 SP_{364}	—	September 20, 2000	Socorro	LINEAR	·	5.1 km	MPC · JPL
62654	2000 SX_{364}	—	September 21, 2000	Anderson Mesa	LONEOS	NYS	2.5 km	MPC · JPL
62655	2000 SY_{364}	—	September 21, 2000	Anderson Mesa	LONEOS	·	3.8 km	MPC · JPL
62656	2000 SJ_{365}	—	September 21, 2000	Anderson Mesa	LONEOS	KOR	3.3 km	MPC · JPL
62657	2000 SK_{365}	—	September 21, 2000	Anderson Mesa	LONEOS	·	6.3 km	MPC · JPL
62658	2000 SN_{365}	—	September 21, 2000	Anderson Mesa	LONEOS	VER	5.9 km	MPC · JPL
62659	2000 SU_{365}	—	September 22, 2000	Anderson Mesa	LONEOS	·	3.2 km	MPC · JPL
62660	2000 SV_{365}	—	September 22, 2000	Anderson Mesa	LONEOS	·	2.2 km	MPC · JPL
62661	2000 SK_{366}	—	September 23, 2000	Anderson Mesa	LONEOS	·	2.2 km	MPC · JPL
62662	2000 SN_{366}	—	September 23, 2000	Anderson Mesa	LONEOS	·	4.9 km	MPC · JPL
62663	2000 SY_{366}	—	September 23, 2000	Anderson Mesa	LONEOS	·	3.0 km	MPC · JPL
62664	2000 SP_{367}	—	September 23, 2000	Socorro	LINEAR	·	3.9 km	MPC · JPL
62665	2000 SU_{370}	—	September 28, 2000	Anderson Mesa	LONEOS	TIR	4.4 km	MPC · JPL
62666 Rainawessen	2000 TA	Rainawessen	October 1, 2000	Farpoint	G. Hug	slow	9.5 km	MPC · JPL
62667	2000 TC	—	October 1, 2000	Desert Beaver	W. K. Y. Yeung	ADE · slow	9.4 km	MPC · JPL
62668	2000 TR_{2}	—	October 1, 2000	Socorro	LINEAR	VER	5.0 km	MPC · JPL
62669	2000 TT_{2}	—	October 1, 2000	Socorro	LINEAR	KOR	3.0 km	MPC · JPL
62670	2000 TK_{8}	—	October 1, 2000	Socorro	LINEAR	MRX	1.8 km	MPC · JPL
62671	2000 TE_{10}	—	October 1, 2000	Socorro	LINEAR	·	5.1 km	MPC · JPL
62672	2000 TY_{10}	—	October 1, 2000	Socorro	LINEAR	EOS	4.9 km	MPC · JPL
62673	2000 TZ_{10}	—	October 1, 2000	Socorro	LINEAR	KOR	2.5 km	MPC · JPL
62674	2000 TL_{11}	—	October 1, 2000	Socorro	LINEAR	KOR	2.6 km	MPC · JPL
62675	2000 TL_{12}	—	October 1, 2000	Socorro	LINEAR	·	3.8 km	MPC · JPL
62676	2000 TQ_{13}	—	October 1, 2000	Socorro	LINEAR	·	4.4 km	MPC · JPL
62677	2000 TE_{14}	—	October 1, 2000	Socorro	LINEAR	·	6.0 km	MPC · JPL
62678	2000 TD_{15}	—	October 1, 2000	Socorro	LINEAR	·	3.4 km	MPC · JPL
62679	2000 TK_{15}	—	October 1, 2000	Socorro	LINEAR	·	5.8 km	MPC · JPL
62680	2000 TV_{15}	—	October 1, 2000	Socorro	LINEAR	·	7.4 km	MPC · JPL
62681	2000 TJ_{17}	—	October 1, 2000	Socorro	LINEAR	KOR	3.1 km	MPC · JPL
62682	2000 TP_{17}	—	October 1, 2000	Socorro	LINEAR	HOF	4.3 km	MPC · JPL
62683	2000 TG_{19}	—	October 1, 2000	Socorro	LINEAR	·	3.5 km	MPC · JPL
62684	2000 TJ_{19}	—	October 1, 2000	Socorro	LINEAR	·	6.8 km	MPC · JPL
62685	2000 TR_{19}	—	October 1, 2000	Socorro	LINEAR	·	2.3 km	MPC · JPL
62686	2000 TD_{20}	—	October 1, 2000	Socorro	LINEAR	·	8.0 km	MPC · JPL
62687	2000 TB_{21}	—	October 1, 2000	Socorro	LINEAR	EOS	6.0 km	MPC · JPL
62688	2000 TQ_{21}	—	October 1, 2000	Socorro	LINEAR	EOS	6.0 km	MPC · JPL
62689	2000 TV_{22}	—	October 1, 2000	Socorro	LINEAR	EOS	3.6 km	MPC · JPL
62690	2000 TS_{23}	—	October 1, 2000	Socorro	LINEAR	·	2.9 km	MPC · JPL
62691	2000 TA_{24}	—	October 2, 2000	Socorro	LINEAR	LEO	6.5 km	MPC · JPL
62692	2000 TE_{24}	—	October 2, 2000	Socorro	LINEAR	L5	16 km	MPC · JPL
62693	2000 TM_{24}	—	October 2, 2000	Socorro	LINEAR	·	3.0 km	MPC · JPL
62694	2000 TV_{24}	—	October 2, 2000	Socorro	LINEAR	HNS	3.4 km	MPC · JPL
62695	2000 TW_{24}	—	October 2, 2000	Socorro	LINEAR	·	4.2 km	MPC · JPL
62696	2000 TT_{25}	—	October 1, 2000	Socorro	LINEAR	THM	6.3 km	MPC · JPL
62697	2000 TV_{25}	—	October 1, 2000	Socorro	LINEAR	·	3.4 km	MPC · JPL
62698	2000 TO_{28}	—	October 4, 2000	Socorro	LINEAR	EOS	3.7 km	MPC · JPL
62699	2000 TQ_{28}	—	October 5, 2000	Haleakala	NEAT	·	2.7 km	MPC · JPL
62700	2000 TA_{30}	—	October 1, 2000	Kitt Peak	Spacewatch	NYS	2.2 km	MPC · JPL

== 62701–62800 ==
back to top

Designation			Discovery			Properties		Ref
Permanent	Provisional	Named after	Date	Site	Discoverer(s)	Category	Diam.	Ref
62701 Davidrankin	2000 TS_{32}	Davidrankin	October 7, 2000	Emerald Lane	L. Ball	·	5.6 km	MPC · JPL
62702	2000 TU_{32}	—	October 1, 2000	Socorro	LINEAR	EOS	3.9 km	MPC · JPL
62703	2000 TG_{34}	—	October 2, 2000	Anderson Mesa	LONEOS	·	5.8 km	MPC · JPL
62704	2000 TT_{35}	—	October 6, 2000	Anderson Mesa	LONEOS	·	3.3 km	MPC · JPL
62705	2000 TY_{36}	—	October 1, 2000	Socorro	LINEAR	·	6.3 km	MPC · JPL
62706	2000 TD_{38}	—	October 1, 2000	Socorro	LINEAR	EUN	3.0 km	MPC · JPL
62707	2000 TF_{38}	—	October 1, 2000	Socorro	LINEAR	V	1.9 km	MPC · JPL
62708	2000 TX_{38}	—	October 1, 2000	Socorro	LINEAR	·	3.2 km	MPC · JPL
62709	2000 TR_{39}	—	October 1, 2000	Socorro	LINEAR	·	3.0 km	MPC · JPL
62710	2000 TF_{40}	—	October 1, 2000	Socorro	LINEAR	MAR	2.2 km	MPC · JPL
62711	2000 TK_{42}	—	October 1, 2000	Socorro	LINEAR	·	6.9 km	MPC · JPL
62712	2000 TO_{42}	—	October 1, 2000	Socorro	LINEAR	·	4.1 km	MPC · JPL
62713	2000 TS_{42}	—	October 1, 2000	Socorro	LINEAR	PHO	3.1 km	MPC · JPL
62714	2000 TB_{43}	—	October 1, 2000	Socorro	LINEAR	L5	17 km	MPC · JPL
62715	2000 TR_{43}	—	October 1, 2000	Socorro	LINEAR	EOS	5.9 km	MPC · JPL
62716	2000 TS_{44}	—	October 1, 2000	Socorro	LINEAR	·	5.6 km	MPC · JPL
62717	2000 TW_{44}	—	October 1, 2000	Socorro	LINEAR	·	9.0 km	MPC · JPL
62718	2000 TR_{45}	—	October 1, 2000	Socorro	LINEAR	EOS	4.5 km	MPC · JPL
62719	2000 TB_{47}	—	October 1, 2000	Anderson Mesa	LONEOS	HOF	6.6 km	MPC · JPL
62720	2000 TH_{48}	—	October 1, 2000	Anderson Mesa	LONEOS	·	1.6 km	MPC · JPL
62721	2000 TM_{50}	—	October 1, 2000	Socorro	LINEAR	EOS	3.9 km	MPC · JPL
62722	2000 TQ_{50}	—	October 1, 2000	Socorro	LINEAR	GEF	2.9 km	MPC · JPL
62723	2000 TG_{51}	—	October 1, 2000	Socorro	LINEAR	·	3.0 km	MPC · JPL
62724	2000 TL_{51}	—	October 1, 2000	Socorro	LINEAR	TEL	8.0 km	MPC · JPL
62725	2000 TW_{51}	—	October 1, 2000	Socorro	LINEAR	EOS	4.5 km	MPC · JPL
62726	2000 TN_{55}	—	October 1, 2000	Anderson Mesa	LONEOS	T_{j} (2.96) · CYB	14 km	MPC · JPL
62727	2000 TQ_{55}	—	October 1, 2000	Socorro	LINEAR	·	4.5 km	MPC · JPL
62728	2000 TV_{56}	—	October 2, 2000	Anderson Mesa	LONEOS	MAR	4.3 km	MPC · JPL
62729	2000 TY_{58}	—	October 2, 2000	Anderson Mesa	LONEOS	·	4.5 km	MPC · JPL
62730	2000 TE_{59}	—	October 2, 2000	Anderson Mesa	LONEOS	·	1.8 km	MPC · JPL
62731	2000 TO_{59}	—	October 2, 2000	Anderson Mesa	LONEOS	·	9.0 km	MPC · JPL
62732	2000 TQ_{59}	—	October 2, 2000	Anderson Mesa	LONEOS	MAR	3.3 km	MPC · JPL
62733	2000 TX_{59}	—	October 2, 2000	Anderson Mesa	LONEOS	AEG	10 km	MPC · JPL
62734	2000 TX_{60}	—	October 2, 2000	Anderson Mesa	LONEOS	·	2.9 km	MPC · JPL
62735	2000 TY_{60}	—	October 2, 2000	Anderson Mesa	LONEOS	·	5.3 km	MPC · JPL
62736	2000 TZ_{60}	—	October 2, 2000	Anderson Mesa	LONEOS	·	2.6 km	MPC · JPL
62737	2000 TR_{61}	—	October 2, 2000	Anderson Mesa	LONEOS	·	10 km	MPC · JPL
62738	2000 TW_{61}	—	October 2, 2000	Anderson Mesa	LONEOS	EOS	5.4 km	MPC · JPL
62739	2000 TW_{62}	—	October 2, 2000	Socorro	LINEAR	·	4.6 km	MPC · JPL
62740	2000 TU_{64}	—	October 1, 2000	Anderson Mesa	LONEOS	·	5.4 km	MPC · JPL
62741	2000 TR_{66}	—	October 1, 2000	Socorro	LINEAR	THM	6.8 km	MPC · JPL
62742	2000 TD_{68}	—	October 6, 2000	Anderson Mesa	LONEOS	·	2.2 km	MPC · JPL
62743	2000 UA_{1}	—	October 21, 2000	Višnjan Observatory	K. Korlević	·	4.8 km	MPC · JPL
62744	2000 UX_{1}	—	October 20, 2000	Monte Agliale	Santangelo, M. M. M.	CYB	9.8 km	MPC · JPL
62745	2000 UY_{1}	—	October 21, 2000	Višnjan Observatory	K. Korlević	·	4.0 km	MPC · JPL
62746	2000 UE_{2}	—	October 22, 2000	Višnjan Observatory	K. Korlević	·	6.2 km	MPC · JPL
62747	2000 UB_{3}	—	October 24, 2000	Črni Vrh	Črni Vrh	·	5.1 km	MPC · JPL
62748	2000 UV_{3}	—	October 24, 2000	Socorro	LINEAR	·	5.0 km	MPC · JPL
62749	2000 UM_{4}	—	October 24, 2000	Socorro	LINEAR	·	2.3 km	MPC · JPL
62750	2000 UO_{4}	—	October 24, 2000	Socorro	LINEAR	·	5.2 km	MPC · JPL
62751	2000 UD_{5}	—	October 24, 2000	Socorro	LINEAR	MAS	1.6 km	MPC · JPL
62752	2000 UB_{6}	—	October 24, 2000	Socorro	LINEAR	·	2.2 km	MPC · JPL
62753	2000 UM_{7}	—	October 24, 2000	Socorro	LINEAR	EOS	5.5 km	MPC · JPL
62754	2000 US_{7}	—	October 24, 2000	Socorro	LINEAR	ADE	4.9 km	MPC · JPL
62755	2000 UF_{8}	—	October 24, 2000	Socorro	LINEAR	·	2.3 km	MPC · JPL
62756	2000 UN_{8}	—	October 24, 2000	Socorro	LINEAR	·	4.6 km	MPC · JPL
62757	2000 UU_{8}	—	October 24, 2000	Socorro	LINEAR	V	1.6 km	MPC · JPL
62758	2000 UH_{9}	—	October 24, 2000	Socorro	LINEAR	·	6.4 km	MPC · JPL
62759	2000 UK_{9}	—	October 24, 2000	Socorro	LINEAR	·	14 km	MPC · JPL
62760	2000 UR_{9}	—	October 24, 2000	Socorro	LINEAR	·	15 km	MPC · JPL
62761	2000 UA_{12}	—	October 18, 2000	Socorro	LINEAR	ADE	8.6 km	MPC · JPL
62762	2000 UB_{12}	—	October 18, 2000	Socorro	LINEAR	PHO	3.1 km	MPC · JPL
62763	2000 UG_{12}	—	October 24, 2000	Socorro	LINEAR	AGN	2.8 km	MPC · JPL
62764	2000 UL_{13}	—	October 23, 2000	Višnjan Observatory	K. Korlević	·	9.1 km	MPC · JPL
62765	2000 UH_{14}	—	October 24, 2000	Socorro	LINEAR	EOS	5.3 km	MPC · JPL
62766	2000 UB_{15}	—	October 25, 2000	Socorro	LINEAR	·	2.2 km	MPC · JPL
62767	2000 UQ_{17}	—	October 24, 2000	Socorro	LINEAR	·	2.3 km	MPC · JPL
62768	2000 UT_{17}	—	October 24, 2000	Socorro	LINEAR	(5)	2.7 km	MPC · JPL
62769	2000 UB_{18}	—	October 24, 2000	Socorro	LINEAR	·	4.2 km	MPC · JPL
62770	2000 UK_{18}	—	October 24, 2000	Socorro	LINEAR	·	7.8 km	MPC · JPL
62771	2000 UN_{18}	—	October 25, 2000	Socorro	LINEAR	·	7.6 km	MPC · JPL
62772	2000 UY_{19}	—	October 24, 2000	Socorro	LINEAR	·	4.3 km	MPC · JPL
62773	2000 UB_{20}	—	October 24, 2000	Socorro	LINEAR	·	2.4 km	MPC · JPL
62774	2000 UE_{20}	—	October 24, 2000	Socorro	LINEAR	·	3.0 km	MPC · JPL
62775	2000 UG_{20}	—	October 24, 2000	Socorro	LINEAR	·	3.4 km	MPC · JPL
62776	2000 UR_{20}	—	October 24, 2000	Socorro	LINEAR	·	3.7 km	MPC · JPL
62777	2000 UE_{21}	—	October 24, 2000	Socorro	LINEAR	THM	6.1 km	MPC · JPL
62778	2000 UU_{21}	—	October 24, 2000	Socorro	LINEAR	EOS	4.1 km	MPC · JPL
62779	2000 UC_{22}	—	October 24, 2000	Socorro	LINEAR	·	7.4 km	MPC · JPL
62780	2000 UF_{22}	—	October 24, 2000	Socorro	LINEAR	·	6.7 km	MPC · JPL
62781	2000 UE_{23}	—	October 24, 2000	Socorro	LINEAR	·	5.0 km	MPC · JPL
62782	2000 UF_{23}	—	October 24, 2000	Socorro	LINEAR	·	2.7 km	MPC · JPL
62783	2000 UO_{23}	—	October 24, 2000	Socorro	LINEAR	·	6.7 km	MPC · JPL
62784	2000 UW_{23}	—	October 24, 2000	Socorro	LINEAR	·	9.7 km	MPC · JPL
62785	2000 UC_{24}	—	October 24, 2000	Socorro	LINEAR	·	1.6 km	MPC · JPL
62786	2000 UQ_{24}	—	October 24, 2000	Socorro	LINEAR	RAF	2.0 km	MPC · JPL
62787	2000 UH_{25}	—	October 24, 2000	Socorro	LINEAR	·	2.8 km	MPC · JPL
62788	2000 UW_{25}	—	October 24, 2000	Socorro	LINEAR	·	2.7 km	MPC · JPL
62789	2000 UZ_{25}	—	October 24, 2000	Socorro	LINEAR	slow	11 km	MPC · JPL
62790	2000 UL_{26}	—	October 24, 2000	Socorro	LINEAR	·	3.5 km	MPC · JPL
62791	2000 UT_{26}	—	October 24, 2000	Socorro	LINEAR	·	7.9 km	MPC · JPL
62792	2000 UV_{28}	—	October 30, 2000	Socorro	LINEAR	EUN	2.6 km	MPC · JPL
62793	2000 UZ_{28}	—	October 29, 2000	Kitt Peak	Spacewatch	·	2.2 km	MPC · JPL
62794 Scheirich	2000 UV_{30}	Scheirich	October 30, 2000	Ondřejov	P. Pravec, P. Kušnirák	·	6.4 km	MPC · JPL
62795	2000 UY_{34}	—	October 24, 2000	Socorro	LINEAR	EOS	3.8 km	MPC · JPL
62796	2000 UO_{35}	—	October 24, 2000	Socorro	LINEAR	·	2.7 km	MPC · JPL
62797	2000 UH_{36}	—	October 24, 2000	Socorro	LINEAR	·	3.1 km	MPC · JPL
62798	2000 UO_{36}	—	October 24, 2000	Socorro	LINEAR	AGN · slow	2.9 km	MPC · JPL
62799	2000 UQ_{36}	—	October 24, 2000	Socorro	LINEAR	NYS	2.5 km	MPC · JPL
62800	2000 UT_{36}	—	October 24, 2000	Socorro	LINEAR	·	4.8 km	MPC · JPL

== 62801–62900 ==
back to top

Designation			Discovery			Properties		Ref
Permanent	Provisional	Named after	Date	Site	Discoverer(s)	Category	Diam.	Ref
62801	2000 UV_{36}	—	October 24, 2000	Socorro	LINEAR	KOR	2.7 km	MPC · JPL
62802	2000 UG_{37}	—	October 24, 2000	Socorro	LINEAR	·	3.6 km	MPC · JPL
62803	2000 UU_{37}	—	October 24, 2000	Socorro	LINEAR	KOR	4.5 km	MPC · JPL
62804	2000 UF_{38}	—	October 24, 2000	Socorro	LINEAR	·	8.3 km	MPC · JPL
62805	2000 UP_{39}	—	October 24, 2000	Socorro	LINEAR	·	5.2 km	MPC · JPL
62806	2000 UW_{39}	—	October 24, 2000	Socorro	LINEAR	KOR	2.9 km	MPC · JPL
62807	2000 UL_{40}	—	October 24, 2000	Socorro	LINEAR	HYG	4.8 km	MPC · JPL
62808	2000 UQ_{40}	—	October 24, 2000	Socorro	LINEAR	KOR	3.2 km	MPC · JPL
62809	2000 UE_{42}	—	October 24, 2000	Socorro	LINEAR	·	1.3 km	MPC · JPL
62810	2000 UH_{42}	—	October 24, 2000	Socorro	LINEAR	·	6.1 km	MPC · JPL
62811	2000 UX_{42}	—	October 24, 2000	Socorro	LINEAR	KOR	2.9 km	MPC · JPL
62812	2000 UC_{43}	—	October 24, 2000	Socorro	LINEAR	(12739)	4.2 km	MPC · JPL
62813	2000 UH_{43}	—	October 24, 2000	Socorro	LINEAR	·	4.3 km	MPC · JPL
62814	2000 UK_{43}	—	October 24, 2000	Socorro	LINEAR	·	2.1 km	MPC · JPL
62815	2000 UW_{43}	—	October 24, 2000	Socorro	LINEAR	V	1.9 km	MPC · JPL
62816	2000 UC_{44}	—	October 24, 2000	Socorro	LINEAR	·	5.3 km	MPC · JPL
62817	2000 UH_{45}	—	October 24, 2000	Socorro	LINEAR	TEL	3.6 km	MPC · JPL
62818	2000 US_{45}	—	October 24, 2000	Socorro	LINEAR	NYS	2.3 km	MPC · JPL
62819	2000 UV_{45}	—	October 24, 2000	Socorro	LINEAR	·	5.5 km	MPC · JPL
62820	2000 UF_{46}	—	October 24, 2000	Socorro	LINEAR	3:2	10 km	MPC · JPL
62821	2000 UE_{47}	—	October 24, 2000	Socorro	LINEAR	·	2.9 km	MPC · JPL
62822	2000 UV_{48}	—	October 24, 2000	Socorro	LINEAR	·	3.1 km	MPC · JPL
62823	2000 UE_{49}	—	October 24, 2000	Socorro	LINEAR	·	9.2 km	MPC · JPL
62824	2000 UG_{49}	—	October 24, 2000	Socorro	LINEAR	GEF	3.3 km	MPC · JPL
62825	2000 UT_{49}	—	October 24, 2000	Socorro	LINEAR	THM	6.7 km	MPC · JPL
62826	2000 UU_{50}	—	October 24, 2000	Socorro	LINEAR	·	4.8 km	MPC · JPL
62827	2000 UX_{50}	—	October 24, 2000	Socorro	LINEAR	EUN	4.1 km	MPC · JPL
62828	2000 UN_{53}	—	October 24, 2000	Socorro	LINEAR	THM	7.4 km	MPC · JPL
62829	2000 UP_{53}	—	October 24, 2000	Socorro	LINEAR	HYG	7.2 km	MPC · JPL
62830	2000 UZ_{53}	—	October 24, 2000	Socorro	LINEAR	·	1.8 km	MPC · JPL
62831	2000 UM_{54}	—	October 24, 2000	Socorro	LINEAR	·	4.8 km	MPC · JPL
62832	2000 UN_{54}	—	October 24, 2000	Socorro	LINEAR	·	6.2 km	MPC · JPL
62833	2000 UB_{56}	—	October 24, 2000	Socorro	LINEAR	·	3.9 km	MPC · JPL
62834	2000 UC_{56}	—	October 24, 2000	Socorro	LINEAR	·	3.4 km	MPC · JPL
62835	2000 UC_{58}	—	October 25, 2000	Socorro	LINEAR	·	4.7 km	MPC · JPL
62836	2000 UC_{59}	—	October 25, 2000	Socorro	LINEAR	·	3.4 km	MPC · JPL
62837	2000 UJ_{59}	—	October 25, 2000	Socorro	LINEAR	·	4.3 km	MPC · JPL
62838	2000 UB_{60}	—	October 25, 2000	Socorro	LINEAR	·	1.6 km	MPC · JPL
62839	2000 UX_{60}	—	October 25, 2000	Socorro	LINEAR	EOS	5.4 km	MPC · JPL
62840	2000 UB_{61}	—	October 25, 2000	Socorro	LINEAR	·	3.8 km	MPC · JPL
62841	2000 UN_{61}	—	October 25, 2000	Socorro	LINEAR	·	3.7 km	MPC · JPL
62842	2000 UF_{63}	—	October 25, 2000	Socorro	LINEAR	·	3.8 km	MPC · JPL
62843	2000 UC_{64}	—	October 25, 2000	Socorro	LINEAR	·	5.0 km	MPC · JPL
62844	2000 UK_{64}	—	October 25, 2000	Socorro	LINEAR	EOS	4.0 km	MPC · JPL
62845	2000 UB_{67}	—	October 25, 2000	Socorro	LINEAR	·	5.1 km	MPC · JPL
62846	2000 UX_{67}	—	October 25, 2000	Socorro	LINEAR	HYG	8.1 km	MPC · JPL
62847	2000 UL_{68}	—	October 25, 2000	Socorro	LINEAR	V	1.3 km	MPC · JPL
62848	2000 US_{71}	—	October 25, 2000	Socorro	LINEAR	·	9.4 km	MPC · JPL
62849	2000 UA_{72}	—	October 25, 2000	Socorro	LINEAR	·	3.6 km	MPC · JPL
62850	2000 UC_{72}	—	October 25, 2000	Socorro	LINEAR	·	2.5 km	MPC · JPL
62851	2000 UM_{72}	—	October 25, 2000	Socorro	LINEAR	·	7.7 km	MPC · JPL
62852	2000 UM_{76}	—	October 30, 2000	Socorro	LINEAR	PHO	2.6 km	MPC · JPL
62853	2000 UO_{76}	—	October 27, 2000	Desert Beaver	W. K. Y. Yeung	slow	7.2 km	MPC · JPL
62854	2000 UW_{76}	—	October 24, 2000	Socorro	LINEAR	THM	5.4 km	MPC · JPL
62855	2000 UE_{77}	—	October 24, 2000	Socorro	LINEAR	·	4.3 km	MPC · JPL
62856	2000 UL_{77}	—	October 24, 2000	Socorro	LINEAR	·	1.7 km	MPC · JPL
62857	2000 UM_{77}	—	October 24, 2000	Socorro	LINEAR	·	2.3 km	MPC · JPL
62858	2000 UT_{78}	—	October 24, 2000	Socorro	LINEAR	·	8.0 km	MPC · JPL
62859	2000 UW_{78}	—	October 24, 2000	Socorro	LINEAR	HYG	7.6 km	MPC · JPL
62860	2000 UJ_{80}	—	October 24, 2000	Socorro	LINEAR	EOS	5.0 km	MPC · JPL
62861	2000 UO_{80}	—	October 24, 2000	Socorro	LINEAR	·	4.1 km	MPC · JPL
62862	2000 UE_{81}	—	October 24, 2000	Socorro	LINEAR	HYG	7.1 km	MPC · JPL
62863	2000 UG_{81}	—	October 24, 2000	Socorro	LINEAR	·	2.8 km	MPC · JPL
62864	2000 UG_{82}	—	October 25, 2000	Socorro	LINEAR	·	3.0 km	MPC · JPL
62865	2000 UL_{82}	—	October 27, 2000	Socorro	LINEAR	EUN	2.7 km	MPC · JPL
62866	2000 UX_{82}	—	October 30, 2000	Socorro	LINEAR	·	7.3 km	MPC · JPL
62867	2000 UG_{83}	—	October 30, 2000	Socorro	LINEAR	HOF	4.8 km	MPC · JPL
62868	2000 UV_{83}	—	October 31, 2000	Socorro	LINEAR	HOF	7.0 km	MPC · JPL
62869	2000 UO_{84}	—	October 31, 2000	Socorro	LINEAR	·	8.4 km	MPC · JPL
62870	2000 UD_{86}	—	October 31, 2000	Socorro	LINEAR	·	4.9 km	MPC · JPL
62871	2000 UA_{87}	—	October 31, 2000	Socorro	LINEAR	EOS	3.3 km	MPC · JPL
62872	2000 UC_{87}	—	October 31, 2000	Socorro	LINEAR	·	2.2 km	MPC · JPL
62873	2000 UK_{87}	—	October 31, 2000	Socorro	LINEAR	·	3.1 km	MPC · JPL
62874	2000 UV_{88}	—	October 31, 2000	Socorro	LINEAR	·	4.6 km	MPC · JPL
62875	2000 UB_{89}	—	October 31, 2000	Socorro	LINEAR	·	4.3 km	MPC · JPL
62876	2000 UH_{90}	—	October 24, 2000	Socorro	LINEAR	·	3.6 km	MPC · JPL
62877	2000 UQ_{90}	—	October 24, 2000	Socorro	LINEAR	·	12 km	MPC · JPL
62878	2000 UY_{90}	—	October 25, 2000	Socorro	LINEAR	·	4.2 km	MPC · JPL
62879	2000 UN_{91}	—	October 25, 2000	Socorro	LINEAR	·	3.3 km	MPC · JPL
62880	2000 US_{91}	—	October 25, 2000	Socorro	LINEAR	·	7.4 km	MPC · JPL
62881	2000 UA_{92}	—	October 25, 2000	Socorro	LINEAR	·	7.2 km	MPC · JPL
62882	2000 UC_{93}	—	October 25, 2000	Socorro	LINEAR	·	1.9 km	MPC · JPL
62883	2000 UQ_{93}	—	October 25, 2000	Socorro	LINEAR	·	8.1 km	MPC · JPL
62884	2000 UY_{93}	—	October 25, 2000	Socorro	LINEAR	·	4.9 km	MPC · JPL
62885	2000 UK_{94}	—	October 25, 2000	Socorro	LINEAR	·	2.3 km	MPC · JPL
62886	2000 UV_{95}	—	October 25, 2000	Socorro	LINEAR	EOS	3.4 km	MPC · JPL
62887	2000 UX_{95}	—	October 25, 2000	Socorro	LINEAR	·	4.0 km	MPC · JPL
62888	2000 UX_{96}	—	October 25, 2000	Socorro	LINEAR	·	4.4 km	MPC · JPL
62889	2000 UZ_{96}	—	October 25, 2000	Socorro	LINEAR	·	3.8 km	MPC · JPL
62890	2000 UZ_{99}	—	October 25, 2000	Socorro	LINEAR	EOS	4.8 km	MPC · JPL
62891	2000 UK_{100}	—	October 25, 2000	Socorro	LINEAR	·	1.8 km	MPC · JPL
62892	2000 UZ_{100}	—	October 25, 2000	Socorro	LINEAR	·	4.1 km	MPC · JPL
62893	2000 UM_{101}	—	October 25, 2000	Socorro	LINEAR	·	2.6 km	MPC · JPL
62894	2000 UP_{101}	—	October 25, 2000	Socorro	LINEAR	·	6.4 km	MPC · JPL
62895	2000 UR_{102}	—	October 25, 2000	Socorro	LINEAR	·	2.2 km	MPC · JPL
62896	2000 UC_{103}	—	October 25, 2000	Socorro	LINEAR	·	2.8 km	MPC · JPL
62897	2000 UL_{103}	—	October 25, 2000	Socorro	LINEAR	EUN	3.8 km	MPC · JPL
62898	2000 UA_{104}	—	October 25, 2000	Socorro	LINEAR	·	2.0 km	MPC · JPL
62899	2000 UT_{104}	—	October 25, 2000	Socorro	LINEAR	·	4.1 km	MPC · JPL
62900	2000 UG_{105}	—	October 29, 2000	Socorro	LINEAR	EOS	5.2 km	MPC · JPL

== 62901–63000 ==
back to top

Designation			Discovery			Properties		Ref
Permanent	Provisional	Named after	Date	Site	Discoverer(s)	Category	Diam.	Ref
62901	2000 UL_{105}	—	October 29, 2000	Socorro	LINEAR	·	4.4 km	MPC · JPL
62902	2000 UH_{106}	—	October 30, 2000	Socorro	LINEAR	·	3.7 km	MPC · JPL
62903	2000 UK_{106}	—	October 30, 2000	Socorro	LINEAR	·	3.9 km	MPC · JPL
62904	2000 UZ_{106}	—	October 30, 2000	Socorro	LINEAR	EOS	4.1 km	MPC · JPL
62905	2000 UQ_{107}	—	October 30, 2000	Socorro	LINEAR	EOS	5.2 km	MPC · JPL
62906	2000 UR_{107}	—	October 30, 2000	Socorro	LINEAR	·	6.5 km	MPC · JPL
62907	2000 UC_{108}	—	October 30, 2000	Socorro	LINEAR	·	2.6 km	MPC · JPL
62908	2000 UH_{108}	—	October 30, 2000	Socorro	LINEAR	·	4.0 km	MPC · JPL
62909	2000 UY_{108}	—	October 31, 2000	Socorro	LINEAR	·	2.7 km	MPC · JPL
62910	2000 UK_{109}	—	October 31, 2000	Socorro	LINEAR	·	11 km	MPC · JPL
62911	2000 UR_{109}	—	October 31, 2000	Socorro	LINEAR	·	5.0 km	MPC · JPL
62912	2000 UD_{110}	—	October 31, 2000	Socorro	LINEAR	·	2.8 km	MPC · JPL
62913	2000 UK_{110}	—	October 31, 2000	Socorro	LINEAR	·	3.9 km	MPC · JPL
62914	2000 VX_{2}	—	November 1, 2000	Desert Beaver	W. K. Y. Yeung	·	5.3 km	MPC · JPL
62915	2000 VY_{2}	—	November 1, 2000	Desert Beaver	W. K. Y. Yeung	EOS	7.6 km	MPC · JPL
62916	2000 VW_{3}	—	November 1, 2000	Socorro	LINEAR	·	3.3 km	MPC · JPL
62917	2000 VR_{8}	—	November 1, 2000	Socorro	LINEAR	·	8.6 km	MPC · JPL
62918	2000 VY_{9}	—	November 1, 2000	Socorro	LINEAR	·	4.6 km	MPC · JPL
62919	2000 VH_{10}	—	November 1, 2000	Socorro	LINEAR	NYS	2.5 km	MPC · JPL
62920	2000 VB_{12}	—	November 1, 2000	Socorro	LINEAR	·	6.9 km	MPC · JPL
62921	2000 VJ_{12}	—	November 1, 2000	Socorro	LINEAR	·	6.4 km	MPC · JPL
62922	2000 VV_{12}	—	November 1, 2000	Socorro	LINEAR	·	6.5 km	MPC · JPL
62923	2000 VC_{13}	—	November 1, 2000	Socorro	LINEAR	EOS	4.0 km	MPC · JPL
62924	2000 VU_{13}	—	November 1, 2000	Socorro	LINEAR	·	7.7 km	MPC · JPL
62925	2000 VE_{14}	—	November 1, 2000	Socorro	LINEAR	THM	6.8 km	MPC · JPL
62926	2000 VK_{14}	—	November 1, 2000	Socorro	LINEAR	·	2.6 km	MPC · JPL
62927	2000 VT_{14}	—	November 1, 2000	Socorro	LINEAR	NAE	6.6 km	MPC · JPL
62928	2000 VV_{14}	—	November 1, 2000	Socorro	LINEAR	·	3.1 km	MPC · JPL
62929	2000 VO_{15}	—	November 1, 2000	Socorro	LINEAR	(11882)	3.6 km	MPC · JPL
62930	2000 VP_{15}	—	November 1, 2000	Socorro	LINEAR	EOS	4.9 km	MPC · JPL
62931	2000 VJ_{16}	—	November 1, 2000	Socorro	LINEAR	V	2.7 km	MPC · JPL
62932	2000 VF_{18}	—	November 1, 2000	Socorro	LINEAR	·	9.5 km	MPC · JPL
62933	2000 VR_{21}	—	November 1, 2000	Socorro	LINEAR	NYS	2.2 km	MPC · JPL
62934	2000 VS_{21}	—	November 1, 2000	Socorro	LINEAR	HYG	7.1 km	MPC · JPL
62935	2000 VP_{22}	—	November 1, 2000	Socorro	LINEAR	·	1.9 km	MPC · JPL
62936	2000 VF_{23}	—	November 1, 2000	Socorro	LINEAR	·	10 km	MPC · JPL
62937	2000 VG_{23}	—	November 1, 2000	Socorro	LINEAR	NYS	2.5 km	MPC · JPL
62938	2000 VJ_{23}	—	November 1, 2000	Socorro	LINEAR	slow	3.0 km	MPC · JPL
62939	2000 VP_{23}	—	November 1, 2000	Socorro	LINEAR	·	3.4 km	MPC · JPL
62940	2000 VS_{23}	—	November 1, 2000	Socorro	LINEAR	·	2.9 km	MPC · JPL
62941	2000 VB_{24}	—	November 1, 2000	Socorro	LINEAR	·	5.1 km	MPC · JPL
62942	2000 VC_{25}	—	November 1, 2000	Socorro	LINEAR	·	3.9 km	MPC · JPL
62943	2000 VY_{25}	—	November 1, 2000	Socorro	LINEAR	·	5.5 km	MPC · JPL
62944	2000 VF_{28}	—	November 1, 2000	Socorro	LINEAR	·	5.2 km	MPC · JPL
62945	2000 VH_{28}	—	November 1, 2000	Socorro	LINEAR	·	3.7 km	MPC · JPL
62946	2000 VG_{30}	—	November 1, 2000	Socorro	LINEAR	·	3.8 km	MPC · JPL
62947	2000 VV_{31}	—	November 1, 2000	Socorro	LINEAR	·	6.4 km	MPC · JPL
62948	2000 VE_{32}	—	November 1, 2000	Socorro	LINEAR	·	5.5 km	MPC · JPL
62949	2000 VS_{33}	—	November 1, 2000	Socorro	LINEAR	BRA	4.7 km	MPC · JPL
62950	2000 VD_{34}	—	November 1, 2000	Socorro	LINEAR	·	13 km	MPC · JPL
62951	2000 VE_{34}	—	November 1, 2000	Socorro	LINEAR	·	6.2 km	MPC · JPL
62952	2000 VV_{34}	—	November 1, 2000	Socorro	LINEAR	·	6.6 km	MPC · JPL
62953	2000 VR_{35}	—	November 1, 2000	Socorro	LINEAR	EOS	4.3 km	MPC · JPL
62954	2000 VD_{36}	—	November 1, 2000	Socorro	LINEAR	·	13 km	MPC · JPL
62955	2000 VZ_{36}	—	November 1, 2000	Socorro	LINEAR	·	3.6 km	MPC · JPL
62956	2000 VK_{37}	—	November 1, 2000	Socorro	LINEAR	·	2.6 km	MPC · JPL
62957	2000 VR_{37}	—	November 1, 2000	Socorro	LINEAR	·	3.0 km	MPC · JPL
62958	2000 VX_{37}	—	November 1, 2000	Socorro	LINEAR	·	11 km	MPC · JPL
62959	2000 VV_{39}	—	November 1, 2000	Socorro	LINEAR	3:2	6.2 km	MPC · JPL
62960	2000 VP_{40}	—	November 1, 2000	Socorro	LINEAR	·	4.9 km	MPC · JPL
62961	2000 VO_{42}	—	November 1, 2000	Socorro	LINEAR	·	3.2 km	MPC · JPL
62962	2000 VA_{43}	—	November 1, 2000	Socorro	LINEAR	·	7.7 km	MPC · JPL
62963	2000 VW_{43}	—	November 1, 2000	Socorro	LINEAR	·	2.6 km	MPC · JPL
62964	2000 VE_{44}	—	November 1, 2000	Socorro	LINEAR	·	2.7 km	MPC · JPL
62965	2000 VH_{44}	—	November 2, 2000	Socorro	LINEAR	KOR	2.7 km	MPC · JPL
62966	2000 VB_{45}	—	November 1, 2000	Socorro	LINEAR	·	5.4 km	MPC · JPL
62967	2000 VM_{45}	—	November 2, 2000	Socorro	LINEAR	·	2.6 km	MPC · JPL
62968	2000 VD_{48}	—	November 2, 2000	Socorro	LINEAR	·	5.5 km	MPC · JPL
62969	2000 VN_{49}	—	November 2, 2000	Socorro	LINEAR	THM	6.3 km	MPC · JPL
62970	2000 VY_{49}	—	November 2, 2000	Socorro	LINEAR	NYS	2.4 km	MPC · JPL
62971	2000 VZ_{49}	—	November 2, 2000	Socorro	LINEAR	·	5.4 km	MPC · JPL
62972	2000 VU_{50}	—	November 2, 2000	Socorro	LINEAR	GEF	2.4 km	MPC · JPL
62973	2000 VP_{51}	—	November 3, 2000	Socorro	LINEAR	·	3.5 km	MPC · JPL
62974	2000 VA_{52}	—	November 3, 2000	Socorro	LINEAR	·	5.3 km	MPC · JPL
62975	2000 VB_{52}	—	November 3, 2000	Socorro	LINEAR	·	2.5 km	MPC · JPL
62976	2000 VO_{52}	—	November 3, 2000	Socorro	LINEAR	·	3.1 km	MPC · JPL
62977	2000 VS_{52}	—	November 3, 2000	Socorro	LINEAR	·	3.5 km	MPC · JPL
62978	2000 VW_{52}	—	November 3, 2000	Socorro	LINEAR	MAR	3.4 km	MPC · JPL
62979	2000 VZ_{52}	—	November 3, 2000	Socorro	LINEAR	·	3.0 km	MPC · JPL
62980	2000 VT_{53}	—	November 3, 2000	Socorro	LINEAR	slow	3.1 km	MPC · JPL
62981	2000 VK_{56}	—	November 3, 2000	Socorro	LINEAR	·	7.6 km	MPC · JPL
62982	2000 VW_{58}	—	November 6, 2000	Elmira	Cecce, A. J.	EUN	3.7 km	MPC · JPL
62983	2000 VB_{59}	—	November 2, 2000	Socorro	LINEAR	·	3.7 km	MPC · JPL
62984	2000 VV_{59}	—	November 1, 2000	Desert Beaver	W. K. Y. Yeung	·	9.3 km	MPC · JPL
62985	2000 VX_{60}	—	November 1, 2000	Kitt Peak	Spacewatch	HYG	6.3 km	MPC · JPL
62986	2000 WM	—	November 16, 2000	Socorro	LINEAR	·	2.2 km	MPC · JPL
62987	2000 WP_{1}	—	November 17, 2000	Socorro	LINEAR	PHO	5.0 km	MPC · JPL
62988	2000 WB_{2}	—	November 18, 2000	Kitt Peak	Spacewatch	EOS	8.0 km	MPC · JPL
62989	2000 WC_{2}	—	November 17, 2000	Fountain Hills	C. W. Juels	·	12 km	MPC · JPL
62990	2000 WM_{2}	—	November 17, 2000	Socorro	LINEAR	·	9.1 km	MPC · JPL
62991	2000 WG_{7}	—	November 20, 2000	Socorro	LINEAR	·	2.2 km	MPC · JPL
62992	2000 WY_{9}	—	November 23, 2000	Farpoint	G. Hug	·	3.5 km	MPC · JPL
62993	2000 WL_{12}	—	November 22, 2000	Haleakala	NEAT	·	7.0 km	MPC · JPL
62994	2000 WZ_{14}	—	November 20, 2000	Socorro	LINEAR	EMA	7.9 km	MPC · JPL
62995	2000 WD_{16}	—	November 21, 2000	Socorro	LINEAR	·	5.0 km	MPC · JPL
62996	2000 WG_{16}	—	November 21, 2000	Socorro	LINEAR	·	1.6 km	MPC · JPL
62997	2000 WD_{17}	—	November 21, 2000	Socorro	LINEAR	THM	5.9 km	MPC · JPL
62998	2000 WK_{18}	—	November 21, 2000	Socorro	LINEAR	·	8.9 km	MPC · JPL
62999	2000 WK_{19}	—	November 25, 2000	Fountain Hills	C. W. Juels	·	6.7 km	MPC · JPL
63000	2000 WZ_{20}	—	November 25, 2000	Kitt Peak	Spacewatch	·	8.5 km	MPC · JPL

back to top

== See also ==
- Meanings of minor-planet names: 62001–63000
