= Meanings of minor-planet names: 62001–63000 =

As minor planet discoveries are confirmed, they are given a permanent number by the IAU's Minor Planet Center (MPC), and the discoverers can then submit names for them, following the IAU's naming conventions. The list below concerns those minor planets in the specified number-range that have received names, and explains the meanings of those names.

Official naming citations of newly named small Solar System bodies are approved and published in a bulletin by IAU's Working Group for Small Bodies Nomenclature (WGSBN). Before May 2021, citations were published in MPC's Minor Planet Circulars for many decades. Recent citations can also be found on the JPL Small-Body Database (SBDB). Until his death in 2016, German astronomer Lutz D. Schmadel compiled these citations into the Dictionary of Minor Planet Names (DMP) and regularly updated the collection.

Based on Paul Herget's The Names of the Minor Planets, Schmadel also researched the unclear origin of numerous asteroids, most of which had been named prior to World War II. This article incorporates text from this source, which is in the public domain: SBDB New namings may only be added to this list below after official publication as the preannouncement of names is condemned. The WGSBN publishes a comprehensive guideline for the naming rules of non-cometary small Solar System bodies.

== 62001–62100 ==
Named minor planet	Provisional	This minor planet was named for...	Ref · Catalog
62071 Voegtli	2000 RH_{77}	Christian Voegtli (born 1959), also spelt Vögtli, is a Swiss physicist who studied theoretical physics in Basel. For many years he has been interested in evolutionary processes and he is very happy now to watch his two funny daughters developing their fitness for the next generation.	JPL · 62071

== 62101–62200 ==
back to top

Named minor planet	Provisional	This minor planet was named for...	Ref · Catalog
62151 Mayumisuzuki	2000 SZ_{20}	Mayumi Suzuki, Japanese pharmacist.	IAU · 62151
62152 Akatsuki	2000 SC_{21}	Translated from Japanese, “Akatsuki” describes the sunrise scene at dawn, when Venus is often visible as the morning star.	IAU · 62152
62190 Augusthorch	2000 SS_{44}	August Horch (1868–1951), German engineer and automobile pioneer. The first Horch automobile was built in 1901.	JPL · 62190

== 62201–62300 ==
back to top

Named minor planet	Provisional	This minor planet was named for...	Ref · Catalog
There are no named minor planets in this number range

== 62301–62400 ==
back to top

Named minor planet	Provisional	This minor planet was named for...	Ref · Catalog
There are no named minor planets in this number range

== 62401–62500 ==
back to top

Named minor planet	Provisional	This minor planet was named for...	Ref · Catalog
There are no named minor planets in this number range

== 62501–62600 ==
back to top

Named minor planet	Provisional	This minor planet was named for...	Ref · Catalog
62503 Tomcave	2000 SL_{233}	Thomas Roland Cave III (1923–2003) was an American amateur astronomer and persistent observer with a special interest in Mars. His planetary observations covered more than half a century. He shared his observatory in California willingly and helped numerous astronomy enthusiasts in the building of their own telescopes (Src).	JPL · 62503

== 62601–62700 ==
back to top

Named minor planet	Provisional	This minor planet was named for...	Ref · Catalog
62666 Rainawessen	2000 TA	Raina Wessen (born 1994) has been the Key Club Treasurer and Associated Student Body Treasurer at Marshall Fundamental High School. She has held positions in her community for NASA's Jet Propulsion Laboratory, the Huntington Memorial Hospital and the Pasadena Humane Society.	JPL · 62666

== 62701–62800 ==
back to top

Named minor planet	Provisional	This minor planet was named for...	Ref · Catalog
62701 Davidrankin	2000 TS_{32}	David Rankin (born 1984) is an American amateur astronomer and observer of near-Earth objects, who reports his follow-up observations to the MPC.	JPL · 62701
62794 Scheirich	2000 UV_{30}	Petr Scheirich (born 1979), a Czech astronomer at the Ondřejov Observatory, who is an expert in the modeling of binary and tumbling asteroids from photometric observations. He also engages in meteorite field searches.	JPL · 62794

== 62801–62900 ==
back to top

Named minor planet	Provisional	This minor planet was named for...	Ref · Catalog
There are no named minor planets in this number range

== 62901–63000 ==
back to top

Named minor planet	Provisional	This minor planet was named for...	Ref · Catalog
There are no named minor planets in this number range

back to top

Preceded by 61,001–62,000	Meanings of minor-planet names List of minor planets: 62,001–63,000	Succeeded by 63,001–64,000
