= Agnesi =

Agnesi is an Italian surname. It is most prevalent in the region of Lombardy. The name is a matronymic from the given name Agnes.

Notable people with the surname include:

- Alberto Agnesi (born 1980), Mexican telenovela actor
- Luigi Agnesi (1833–1875), Belgian operatic bass-baritone, conductor and composer
- Maria Gaetana Agnesi (1718–1799), Italian linguist, mathematician and philosopher; sister of Maria Teresa
- Maria Teresa Agnesi Pinottini (1720–1795), Italian composer; sister of Maria Gaetana
- Troilo Agnesi, 15th-century Roman Catholic prelate

== See also ==
- Agnesi (crater), on Venus, named for Maria Gaetana
- Agnesi (company), an Italian food company
- Witch of Agnesi, a mathematical curve named after Maria Gaetana
- 16765 Agnesi, an asteroid, named for Maria Gaetana
