= Italian names in the Solar System =

There are a number of objects in the Solar System that have been named after Italian people or places. Many of these are craters on the terrestrial planets but asteroids and exoplanets have also received Italian names.

== Moons ==
=== The Moon ===
- Abetti (crater)
- Dante (crater)

=== Ganymede ===
- Galileo Regio

=== Titan ===
- Elba Facula
- Genova Sinus
- Mezzoramia (Titan)

=== Ariel ===
- Befana crater

== Venus ==
- Agnesi (crater)
- Bassi crater
- Caccini crater
- Cortese crater
- d'Este crater
- Deledda crater

== Mars ==
- Cagli crater
- Cefalù
- Crotone
- Herculaneum
- Locana
- Mistretta
- Nardo
- Neive
- Novara
- Pompeii
- Sarno

== Ceres ==
- Piazzi, a dark region southwest of Dantu crater

== Asteroids ==
- 472 Roma
- 477 Italia
- 487 Venetia
- 2999 Dante
- 7794 Sanvito
- 16765 Agnesi

=== Ida and Dactyl ===
- Azzurra crater
- Castellana crater
- Stiffe crater
