= Tisiphone (disambiguation) =

Tisiphone is the name of two figures in Greek mythology.

Tisiphone may also refer to:

In Biology:

- Tisiphone (genus), a genus of butterflies of the subfamily Satyrinae in the family Nymphalidae
- An archaic taxonomic synonym for Agkistrodon, a.k.a. moccasins, a genus of venomous pitvipers found in North America from the United States south to northern Costa Rica
- An archaic taxonomic synonym for Calloselasma, a.k.a. the Malayan pit viper, a monotypic genus created for a venomous pitviper species, C. rhodostoma, that is found in Southeast Asia from Thailand to northern Malaysia and on the island of Java

Other:

- 466 Tisiphone, an asteroid which orbits among the Cybele family of asteroids
