= Luigi Carnera =

Italian astronomer and mathematician (1875–1962)

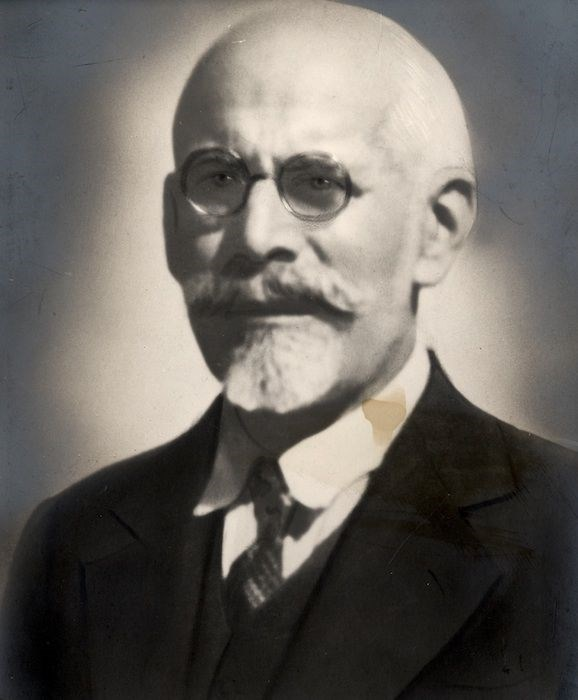
- Luigi Carnera
- Born: 14 April 1875; Trieste, Italy
- Died: 30 June 1962 (aged 87); Florence, Italy
- Known for: Discovery of asteroids
- Scientific career
- Fields: Astronomy, Mathematics
- Institutions: Trieste Observatory, Astronomical Observatory of Capodimonte

Minor planets discovered: 16
| 466 Tisiphone | 17 January 1901 | list^{[A]} |
| 469 Argentina | 20 February 1901 | list |
| 470 Kilia | 21 April 1901 | list |
| 472 Roma | 11 July 1901 | list |
| 476 Hedwig | 17 August 1901 | list |
| 477 Italia | 23 August 1901 | list |
| 478 Tergeste | 21 September 1901 | list |
| 479 Caprera | 12 November 1901 | list |
| 480 Hansa | 21 May 1901 | list^{[A]} |
| 481 Emita | 12 February 1902 | list |
| 485 Genua | 7 May 1902 | list |
| 486 Cremona | 11 May 1902 | list |
| 487 Venetia | 9 July 1902 | list |
| 488 Kreusa | 26 June 1902 | list^{[A]} |
| 489 Comacina | 2 September 1902 | list |
| 808 Merxia | 11 October 1901 | list |
^{A} co-discovered with Max Wolf

Luigi Carnera (born in Trieste April 14, 1875, died in Florence, July 30, 1962) was an Italian astronomer and mathematician. He discovered 16 minor planets in the early 20th century. The main-belt asteroid 39653 Carnera was named in his honour.

In his early career he worked as Max Wolf's assistant at Heidelberg, Germany he discovered a number of asteroids. He worked in Germany, Italy and Argentina before returning to Italy for good in 1908.

He was director of Trieste Observatory starting in 1919; Trieste had just been annexed to Italy following World War I. He then became director of Capodimonte Observatory in Naples starting in 1932 and until his retirement in 1950. In 1943 during World War II, the observatory was temporarily occupied by American and British troops in order to install a radar station.
