= 478 Tergeste =

Main-belt asteroid

Discovery
- Discovered by: L. Carnera
- Discovery site: Heidelberg Obs.
- Discovery date: 21 September 1901

Designations
- Pronunciation: /tərˈdʒɛstiː/
- Named after: Trieste (Italian city)
- Alternative designations: 1901 GU · 1948 RU_{1}
- Minor planet category: main-belt · (outer)

Orbital characteristics
- Epoch 16 February 2017 (JD 2457800.5)
- Uncertainty parameter 0
- Observation arc: 115.13 yr (42,051 days)
- Aphelion: 3.2697 AU
- Perihelion: 2.7659 AU
- Semi-major axis: 3.0178 AU
- Eccentricity: 0.0835
- Orbital period (sidereal): 5.24 yr (1,915 days)
- Mean anomaly: 274.22°
- Mean motion: 0° 11^{m} 16.8^{s} / day
- Inclination: 13.182°
- Longitude of ascending node: 233.90°
- Argument of perihelion: 239.54°

Physical characteristics
- Mean diameter: 83 ± 4 km (pole solution 1); 81+5 −4 km (pole solution 2)
- Mass: (1.06±0.21)×10^{18} kg (Note: Calculated from its standard gravitational parameter GM = 0.071±0.014 km^{3}/s^{2}.)
- Mean density: 3.55–3.82 g/cm^{3} (calculated)
- Synodic rotation period: 16.10308±0.00004 h (pole solution 1); 16.10312±0.00004 h (pole solution 2)
- Pole ecliptic longitude: 2° ± 5° or 216° ± 7°
- Pole ecliptic latitude: −38° ± 8° or −62° ± 4°
- Geometric albedo: 0.16+0.05 −0.01 (pole solution 1); 0.18+0.03 −0.02 (pole solution 2); 0.155±0.005; 0.174±0.045; 0.1798±0.007 (IRAS:21); 0.1902±0.0282; 0.1914
- Spectral type: B–V = 0.850; U–B = 0.445; S (Tholen); L (SMASS) · L
- Absolute magnitude (H): 7.96±0.05 · 7.97±0.23 · 7.98

478 Tergeste is a rare-type stony asteroid from the outer region of the asteroid belt, approximately 78 kilometers in diameter. It was discovered on 21 September 1901, by Italian astronomer Luigi Carnera at Heidelberg Observatory in southern Germany. It was named after the Italian city of Trieste.

== Classification and orbit ==
Tergeste orbits the Sun in the outer main-belt at a distance of 2.8–3.3 AU once every 5 years and 3 months (1,915 days). Its orbit has an eccentricity of 0.08 and an inclination of 13° with respect to the ecliptic. The body's observation arc begins with its first used observation at Koenigsberg Observatory, 2 days after its official discovery at Heidelberg.

== Physical characteristics ==
Tergeste is a stony S-type asteroid, which belongs to the small group of 41 bodies classified as rare L-subtype in the SMASS taxonomy.

=== Diameter and albedo ===
According to the surveys carried out by the Infrared Astronomical Satellite IRAS, the Japanese Akari satellite, and NASA's Wide-field Infrared Survey Explorer with its subsequent NEOWISE mission, Tergeste measures between 77.3 and 85.6 kilometers in diameter, and its surface has an albedo between 0.155 and 0.191. The Collaborative Asteroid Lightcurve Link agrees with the revised WISE results and takes an albedo of 0.1914, an absolute magnitude of 7.96 and a diameter of 77.1 kilometers.

=== Lightcurves ===
In July 2005, a rotational lightcurve of Tergeste was obtained by several photometrists including Laurent Bernasconi, Reiner Stoss, Petra Korlević and Raoul Behrend. The light-curve gave a rotation period of 16.104±0.001 hours with a brightness variation of 0.23 in magnitude (U=2+), superseding a period of 15±5 hours from the 1980s (U=n/a).

In January 2013, another lightcurve was obtained during a photometric survey by predominantly Polish and Japanese observatories. It gave a similar period of 16.105±0.001 hours with an amplitude of 0.30 magnitude (U=n/a).

== Naming ==
This minor planet is named for the northeastern Italian city of Trieste (also known by its pre-Roman name "Tergeste"). It is the birthplace of the discoverer, who also worked there as director of the Trieste Observatory for many years.
