= 488 Kreusa =

Main-belt asteroid

Kreusa
Discovery
- Discovered by: Max Wolf; Luigi Carnera
- Discovery site: Heidelberg
- Discovery date: 26 June 1902

Designations
- Pronunciation: /kriːˈuːsə/
- Alternative designations: 1902 JG, 1947 KH, 1977 YD, A901 CA, A905 XA
- Minor planet category: Asteroid belt

Orbital characteristics
- Epoch 31 July 2016 (JD 2457600.5)
- Uncertainty parameter 0
- Observation arc: 115.18 yr (42068 d)
- Aphelion: 3.67325 AU (549.510 Gm)
- Perihelion: 2.66507 AU (398.689 Gm)
- Semi-major axis: 3.16916 AU (474.100 Gm)
- Eccentricity: 0.15906084
- Orbital period (sidereal): 5.64 yr (2060.7 d)
- Mean anomaly: 197.66463°
- Mean motion: 0° 10^{m} 28.913^{s} / day
- Inclination: 11.517875°
- Longitude of ascending node: 84.23348°
- Argument of perihelion: 71.36554°

Physical characteristics
- Mean diameter: 167.51±6.56 km (composite estimate); 168.117±2.062 km
- Mass: (2.47 ± 0.425) × 10^{18} kg (composite estimate) (3.69±0.63)×10^{18} kg (Note: Calculated from its standard gravitational parameter GM = 0.246±0.042 km^{3}/s^{2}.)
- Mean density: 1.00 ± 0.21 g/cm^{3} 1.48 g/cm^{3}
- Synodic rotation period: 32.645 h (1.3602 d)
- Geometric albedo: 0.047±0.006
- Spectral type: C (Tholen); B−V=0.691±0.06; U−B=0.368±0.030
- Absolute magnitude (H): 7.89

488 Kreusa is a C-type asteroid orbiting the Sun in the asteroid belt, with the type indicating a surface with a low albedo and high carbonaceous content. The spectra of the asteroid displays evidence of aqueous alteration.

In 2002, Kreusa was detected by radar from the Arecibo Observatory at a distance of 1.67 AU. The resulting data yielded an effective diameter of 150±21 km.
