= 25000 Astrometria =

Main-belt asteroid

Discovery
- Discovered by: P. G. Comba
- Discovery site: Prescott Obs.
- Discovery date: 28 July 1998

Designations
- Named after: astrometry (branch of astronomy)
- Alternative designations: 1998 OW_{5}
- Minor planet category: main-belt · (outer) background

Orbital characteristics
- Epoch 4 September 2017 (JD 2458000.5)
- Uncertainty parameter 0
- Observation arc: 35.25 yr (12,875 d)
- Aphelion: 3.4706 AU
- Perihelion: 2.8558 AU
- Semi-major axis: 3.1632 AU
- Eccentricity: 0.0972
- Orbital period (sidereal): 5.63 yr (2,055 days)
- Mean anomaly: 307.37°
- Mean motion: 0° 10^{m} 30.72^{s} / day
- Inclination: 14.935°
- Longitude of ascending node: 142.05°
- Argument of perihelion: 13.193°

Physical characteristics
- Mean diameter: 17.483±0.213 km 22.77±1.8 km
- Geometric albedo: 0.0311±0.006; 0.053±0.007
- Absolute magnitude (H): 12.6 · 12.7

25000 Astrometria (provisional designation 1998 OW_{5}) is a dark background asteroid from the outer regions of the asteroid belt, approximately 20 kilometers in diameter. It was discovered on 28 July 1998, by American astronomer Paul Comba at his Prescott Observatory in Arizona, United States. The asteroid was named in honor of the astronomical branch astrometry.

== Orbit and classification ==
Astrometria is a non-family from the main belt's background population. It orbits the Sun in the outer asteroid belt at a distance of 2.9–3.5 AU once every 5 years and 8 months (2,055 days; semi-major axis of 3.16 AU). Its orbit has an eccentricity of 0.10 and an inclination of 15° with respect to the ecliptic.

Published by the Digitized Sky Survey, the asteroid was first observed at the Siding Spring Observatory, Australia, in August 1982. The body's observation arc begins with its official discovery observation at Prescott Observatory.

== Physical characteristics ==
Astrometria is likely a carbonaceous C-type asteroid or potentially an even darker D-type or primitive P-type asteroid based on its low albedo (see below).

=== Rotation period ===
As of 2018, no rotational lightcurve of Astrometria has been obtained from photometric observations. The body's rotation period, pole and shape remain unknown.

=== Diameter and albedo ===
According to the surveys carried out by the Infrared Astronomical Satellite IRAS and the NEOWISE mission of NASA's Wide-field Infrared Survey Explorer, Astrometria measures 17.483 and 22.77 kilometers in diameter and its surface has a low albedo of 0.053 and 0.0311, respectively.

== Naming ==
This minor planet was named after the astronomical branch astrometry, that precisely measures the positions and movements of astronomical objects including small Solar System bodies. The official naming citation was published by the Minor Planet Center on 4 August 2001 (M.P.C. 43195).
