= 489 Comacina =

Main-belt asteroid

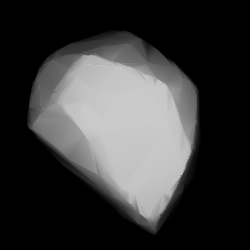
- Shape of Comacina from modeled lightcurve

Discovery
- Discovered by: Luigi Carnera
- Discovery site: Heidelberg
- Discovery date: 2 September 1902

Designations
- Pronunciation: /kɒməˈsaɪnə/
- Named after: Isola Comacina
- Alternative designations: 1902 JM
- Adjectives: Comacinian /kɒməˈsɪniən/

Orbital characteristics
- Epoch 31 July 2016 (JD 2457600.5)
- Uncertainty parameter 0
- Observation arc: 105.09 yr (38384 d)
- Aphelion: 3.2927 AU (492.58 Gm)
- Perihelion: 3.0089 AU (450.13 Gm)
- Semi-major axis: 3.1508 AU (471.35 Gm)
- Eccentricity: 0.045031
- Orbital period (sidereal): 5.59 yr (2042.8 d)
- Mean anomaly: 282.24°
- Mean motion: 0° 10^{m} 34.428^{s} / day
- Inclination: 13.000°
- Longitude of ascending node: 166.898°
- Argument of perihelion: 12.215°

Physical characteristics
- Mean radius: 69.695±1.5 km
- Mass: (1.15±0.52)×10^{18} kg (Note: Calculated from its standard gravitational parameter GM = 0.077±0.035 km^{3}/s^{2}.)
- Mean density: 0.82 g/cm^{3} (Note: Assuming a diameter of 139 km.)
- Synodic rotation period: 9.02 h (0.376 d)
- Geometric albedo: 0.0427±0.002
- Absolute magnitude (H): 8.32

489 Comacina is a minor planet located in the asteroid belt. It is named after Isola Comacina, an island in Lake Como, Italy.
