= 481 Emita =

Main-belt asteroid

Discovery
- Discovered by: Luigi Carnera
- Discovery site: Heidelberg
- Discovery date: 12 February 1902

Designations
- Alternative designations: 1902 HP

Orbital characteristics
- Epoch 31 July 2016 (JD 2457600.5)
- Uncertainty parameter 0
- Observation arc: 110.33 yr (40299 d)
- Aphelion: 3.1702 AU (474.26 Gm)
- Perihelion: 2.3130 AU (346.02 Gm)
- Semi-major axis: 2.7416 AU (410.14 Gm)
- Eccentricity: 0.15633
- Orbital period (sidereal): 4.54 yr (1658.1 d)
- Mean anomaly: 141.033°
- Mean motion: 0° 13^{m} 1.632^{s} / day
- Inclination: 9.8399°
- Longitude of ascending node: 66.753°
- Argument of perihelion: 349.783°

Physical characteristics
- Mean diameter: 107.74±5.40 km (composite estimate)
- Mass: (1.14±0.25)×10^{18} kg (Note: Calculated from its standard gravitational parameter GM = 0.076±0.017 km^{3}/s^{2}.)
- Mean density: 2.07 g/cm^{3} (Note: Assuming a diameter of 102 km.)
- Synodic rotation period: 14.35 h (0.598 d)
- Absolute magnitude (H): 8.66, 8.8

481 Emita is a minor planet orbiting the Sun that was discovered by the Italian astronomer Luigi Carnera on February 12, 1902. The meaning of the asteroid's proper name remains unknown.
