= Paul G. Comba =

Italian-American computer scientist (1926–2017)

- Born: 1926; Tunisia, French Tunisia
- Died: April 5, 2017 (aged 90–91)
- Education: University of Turin; Bluffton College; Caltech
- Awards: Leslie C. Peltier Award (2003)
- Scientific career
- Fields: Mathematics, Computer Science, Astronomy
- Workplaces: University of Hawaiʻi, IBM Cambridge Scientific Center
- Thesis: Geometry of finite dimensional moment spaces and applications to orthogonal polynomials (1952)
- Doctoral advisor: Frederic Bohnenblust

Minor planets discovered: 690
see § List of discovered minor planets

Paul G. Comba (1926 – April 5, 2017) was an Italian-American computer scientist, an amateur astronomer and a prolific discoverer of minor planets.

He was born in the French protectorate of Tunisia to Italian Tunisian parents in 1926, and moved to Italy at a young age. Admitted to university studies at the age of 17, He attended the University of Turin (1943–46). In 1946 he moved to the United States to attend Bluffton College, from which he graduated in 1947. He then attended Caltech, and completed his Ph.D. work in mathematics in 1951 (the degree was conferred at commencement in 1952). In 1951 he moved to Honolulu where he taught at the University of Hawaiʻi until 1960.

He then joined IBM as a software developer, and later as a member of the IBM Cambridge Scientific Center. There he worked in Cryptography, and also developed a multiplication algorithm for large numbers, which reduces the multiplication time to as little as 3% of the conventional algorithm.

In 2003 he won the Leslie C. Peltier Award for his contribution to astronomy.

He is the author of the Astronomical League's Asteroid Club Observing Guide, and was an active member of the Prescott Astronomy Club.

== Prescott Observatory ==
Prescott Observatory
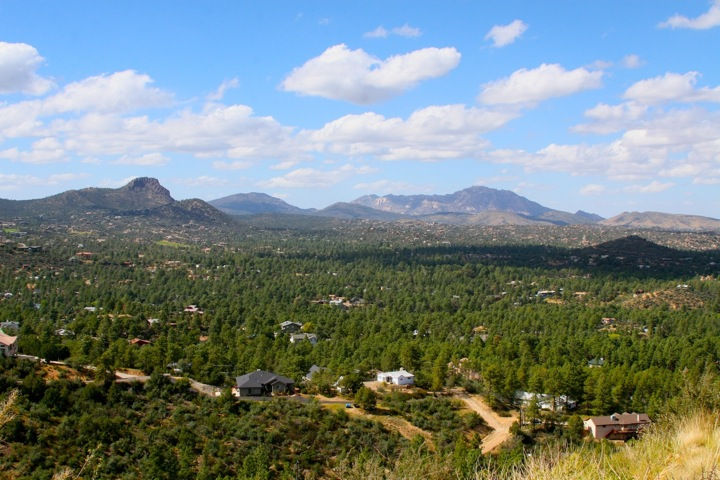
- Observatory code: 684
- Location: Prescott, Yavapai County, Arizona
- Coordinates: 34°30′45″N 112°29′24″W

After retirement in 1991, Comba moved to Prescott, Arizona, where he built the Prescott Observatory (obs. code: 684) There he specialized in discovering asteroids and has been recognized for the discovery of 644 numbered objects as of September 2013.

Refurbished in 2011, the observatory houses a PlaneWave CDK 24 inch telescope with two Takahashi wide field refractors in the dome. There is a dedicated solar observatory that is equipped with a Lunt 152 solar telescope. The observatory also has a nano lab for cosmology research that is currently equipped with a JEOL 5800LV SEM (scanning electron microscope). Prescott Observatory is an active contributor for the webcast organization SLOOH which is the premiere webcast organization for live celestial events. The observatory is now owned and operated by Matt Francis.

=== List of discovered minor planets ===
7684 Marioferrero	3 March 1997	list
8223 Bradshaw	6 August 1996	list
8224 Fultonwright	6 August 1996	list
8407 Houlahan	25 July 1995	list
8420 Angrogna	17 November 1996	list
8580 Pinsky	14 December 1996	list
8583 Froberger	8 January 1997	list
8734 Warner	1 January 1997	list
8945 Cavaradossi	1 February 1997	list
9238 Yavapai	28 April 1997	list
9445 Charpentier	8 May 1997	list
9662 Frankhubbard	12 April 1996	list
9669 Symmetria	8 July 1997	list
9902 Kirkpatrick	3 July 1997	list
9903 Leonhardt	4 July 1997	list
9987 Peano	29 July 1997	list
9988 Erictemplebell	9 September 1997	list
10181 Davidacomba	26 March 1996	list
10204 Turing	1 August 1997	list
10382 Hadamard	15 September 1996	list
10588 Adamcrandall	18 July 1996	list
10598 Markrees	13 October 1996	list
10607 Amandahatton	13 November 1996	list
10914 Tucker	31 December 1997	list
11156 Al-Khwarismi	31 December 1997	list

11341 Babbage	3 December 1996	list
11421 Cardano	10 June 1999	list
11665 Dirichlet	14 April 1997	list
11709 Eudoxos	27 April 1998	list
12007 Fermat	11 October 1996	list
12016 Green	1 December 1996	list
12022 Hilbert	15 December 1996	list
12032 Ivory	31 January 1997	list
12040 Jacobi	8 March 1997	list
12045 Klein	30 March 1997	list
12473 Levi-Civita	10 February 1997	list
12493 Minkowski	4 August 1997	list
12513 Niven	27 April 1998	list
12576 Oresme	5 September 1999	list
12874 Poisson	19 August 1998	list
13192 Quine	31 January 1997	list
13642 Ricci	19 April 1996	list
13658 Sylvester	18 March 1997	list
13672 Tarski	30 May 1997	list
13673 Urysohn	1 June 1997	list
14072 Volterra	21 May 1996	list
14100 Weierstrass	8 September 1997	list
14526 Xenocrates	6 May 1997	list
14960 Yule	21 May 1996	list
14990 Zermelo	31 October 1997	list

14995 Archytas	5 November 1997	list
15378 Artin	7 August 1997	list
15396 Howardmoore	24 October 1997	list
15620 Beltrami	29 April 2000	list
15896 Birkhoff	13 June 1997	list
15938 Bohnenblust	27 December 1997	list
16065 Borel	11 September 1999	list
16246 Cantor	27 April 2000	list
16249 Cauchy	29 April 2000	list
16755 Cayley	9 September 1996	list
16765 Agnesi	16 October 1996	list
16810 Pavelaleksandrov	25 October 1997	list
16856 Banach	28 December 1997	list
16953 Besicovitch	27 May 1998	list
17076 Betti	18 April 1999	list
17285 Bezout	3 July 2000	list
17637 Blaschke	11 August 1996	list
17653 Bochner	10 November 1996	list
17696 Bombelli	8 March 1997	list
17703 Bombieri	9 September 1997	list
17734 Boole	22 January 1998	list
17891 Buraliforti	6 March 1999	list
17917 Cartan	15 April 1999	list
18059 Cavalieri	15 December 1999	list
18498 Cesaro	22 June 1996	list

18510 Chasles	16 September 1996	list
18548 Christoffel	10 January 1997	list
18555 Courant	4 February 1997	list
18560 Coxeter	7 March 1997	list
18734 Darboux	20 June 1998	list
19293 Dedekind	18 July 1996	list
19349 Denjoy	13 February 1997	list
19462 Ulissedini	27 April 1998	list
19570 Jessedouglas	13 June 1999	list
19617 Duhamel	8 August 1999	list
20135 Juels	7 May 1996	list
20136 Eisenhart	8 July 1996	list
20155 Utewindolf	13 October 1996	list
20156 Herbwindolf	13 October 1996	list
20174 Eisenstein	13 December 1996	list
20197 Enriques	14 February 1997	list
20394 Fatou	28 June 1998	list
21276 Feller	8 October 1996	list
21331 Lodovicoferrari	17 January 1997	list
21451 Fisher	28 April 1998	list
21537 Fréchet	15 August 1998	list
21659 Fredholm	13 August 1999	list
21665 Frege	5 September 1999	list
22474 Frobenius	8 March 1997	list
22495 Fubini	6 May 1997	list

22497 Immanuelfuchs	30 May 1997	list
22611 Galerkin	17 May 1998	list
23625 Gelfond	19 November 1996	list
23699 Paulgordan	8 July 1997	list
23776 Gosset	17 August 1998	list
23777 Goursat	23 August 1998	list
23889 Hermanngrassmann	26 September 1998	list
24907 Alfredhaar	4 February 1997	list
24935 Godfreyhardy	28 April 1997	list
24944 Harish-Chandra	11 June 1997	list
24947 Hausdorff	7 July 1997	list
24998 Hermite	28 July 1998	list
25000 Astrometria	28 July 1998	list
25029 Ludwighesse	26 August 1998	list
25082 Williamhodge	15 September 1998	list
25142 Hopf	26 September 1998	list
25237 Hurwitz	20 October 1998	list
25593 Camillejordan	28 December 1999	list
25604 Karlin	4 January 2000	list
25624 Kronecker	6 January 2000	list
25628 Kummer	7 January 2000	list
26205 Kuratowski	11 June 1997	list
26276 Natrees	20 September 1998	list
26277 Ianrees	20 September 1998	list
26357 Laguerre	27 December 1998	list

26908 Lebesgue	11 April 1996	list
26909 Lefschetz	24 April 1996	list
26950 Legendre	11 May 1997	list
26955 Lie	30 June 1997	list
26960 Liouville	8 July 1997	list
26993 Littlewood	3 December 1997	list
27056 Ginoloria	26 September 1998	list
27114 Lukasiewicz	19 November 1998	list
27500 Mandelbrot	12 April 2000	list
27514 Markov	26 April 2000	list
27915 Nancywright	30 October 1996	list
27922 Mascheroni	8 December 1996	list
27947 Emilemathieu	9 July 1997	list
27975 Mazurkiewicz	23 October 1997	list
27988 Menabrea	7 November 1997	list
28394 Mittag-Leffler	13 September 1999	list
28516 Möbius	27 February 2000	list
28729 Moivre	11 April 2000	list
28766 Monge	29 April 2000	list
29435 Mordell	8 May 1997	list
29447 Jerzyneyman	12 August 1997	list
29448 Pappos	23 August 1997	list
29458 Pearson	30 September 1997	list
29463 Benjaminpeirce	2 October 1997	list
29491 Pfaff	23 November 1997	list

29613 Charlespicard	16 September 1998	list
29643 Plücker	15 November 1998	list
29646 Polya	16 November 1998	list
29647 Poncelet	17 November 1998	list
29700 Salmon	19 December 1998	list
29837 Savage	21 March 1999	list
29910 Segre	14 May 1999	list
30305 Severi	1 May 2000	list
30306 Frigyesriesz	2 May 2000	list
30307 Marcelriesz	2 May 2000	list
30417 Staudt	1 June 2000	list
30418 Jakobsteiner	1 June 2000	list
30443 Stieltjes	3 July 2000	list
30445 Stirling	5 July 2000	list
30566 Stokes	29 July 2001	list
31043 Sturm	11 June 1996	list
31122 Brooktaylor	21 September 1997	list
31189 Tricomi	27 December 1997	list
31665 Veblen	10 May 1999	list
31823 Viète	4 October 1999	list
31931 Sipiera	10 April 2000	list
31956 Wald	13 April 2000	list
31982 Johnwallis	30 April 2000	list
32267 Hermannweyl	1 August 2000	list
33004 Dianesipiera	2 March 1997	list

33044 Erikdavy	20 October 1997	list
33113 Julabeth	22 January 1998	list
(33152) 1998 DV_{12}	26 February 1998	list
(33432) 1999 ET_{3}	15 March 1999	list
(33693) 1999 KA	16 May 1999	list
(33954) 2000 ND	1 July 2000	list
(33955) 2000 NC_{3}	6 July 2000	list
(33996) 2000 OK_{2}	28 July 2000	list
(34086) 2000 PP_{5}	5 August 2000	list
(34170) 2000 QX_{33}	26 August 2000	list
(35278) 1996 SM	16 September 1996	list
(35374) 1997 VK	1 November 1997	list
(35440) 1998 BG_{30}	29 January 1998	list
(35469) 1998 ED_{3}	2 March 1998	list
(35946) 1999 KO_{4}	20 May 1999	list
(36297) 2000 JM_{5}	5 May 2000	list
(36425) 2000 PM_{5}	5 August 2000	list
(37707) 1996 RK_{3}	15 September 1996	list
(37791) 1997 VB_{4}	7 November 1997	list
(37861) 1998 FA_{5}	23 March 1998	list
(37862) 1998 FR_{5}	24 March 1998	list
(38025) 1998 QF	17 August 1998	list
(38450) 1999 TH	2 October 1999	list
(38455) 1999 TK_{3}	4 October 1999	list
(38458) 1999 TP_{12}	12 October 1999	list

(38607) 2000 AN_{6}	4 January 2000	list
(39687) 1996 RL_{3}	15 September 1996	list
(39697) 1996 TH_{5}	9 October 1996	list
(39715) 1996 VT	2 November 1996	list
(39827) 1998 BA_{3}	19 January 1998	list
(40093) 1998 NH	15 July 1998	list
(40255) 1999 CN_{4}	12 February 1999	list
(40326) 1999 MA	18 June 1999	list
(40445) 1999 RY_{35}	12 September 1999	list
(40742) 1999 TK	2 October 1999	list
(40743) 1999 TL	2 October 1999	list
(41338) 1999 YF_{4}	25 December 1999	list
(41455) 2000 NC	1 July 2000	list
(41456) 2000 NT	3 July 2000	list
(42579) 1997 BV_{5}	31 January 1997	list
(42689) 1998 KX	23 May 1998	list
(42706) 1998 QY	19 August 1998	list
(43194) 2000 AJ_{6}	4 January 2000	list
(43499) 2001 CY_{19}	3 February 2001	list
(44002) 1997 ST_{1}	23 September 1997	list
(44115) 1998 HQ_{23}	28 April 1998	list
(44172) 1998 KN_{9}	28 May 1998	list
(44233) 1998 QM_{28}	26 August 1998	list
(44710) 1999 TM_{3}	4 October 1999	list
(44721) 1999 TG_{10}	8 October 1999	list

(44723) 1999 TQ_{12}	12 October 1999	list
(44725) 1999 TD_{14}	13 October 1999	list
(45039) 1999 XW_{7}	4 December 1999	list
(45266) 2000 AK_{6}	4 January 2000	list
(45546) 2000 CE_{41}	6 February 2000	list
(45578) 2000 CL_{77}	8 February 2000	list
(45770) 2000 NM_{2}	5 July 2000	list
(46723) 1997 RS_{2}	5 September 1997	list
(46825) 1998 OJ_{2}	25 July 1998	list
(46830) 1998 PU	15 August 1998	list
(46831) 1998 QH	17 August 1998	list
(46877) 1998 RU	12 September 1998	list
(47166) 1999 TT_{18}	15 October 1999	list
(47465) 1999 YZ_{4}	28 December 1999	list
(48703) 1996 JQ	12 May 1996	list
(48716) 1996 RH_{3}	13 September 1996	list
(48912) 1998 OT_{1}	24 July 1998	list
(48913) 1998 OH_{2}	25 July 1998	list
(48933) 1998 QD	17 August 1998	list
(49346) 1998 WK_{4}	21 November 1998	list
(49621) 1999 GL	6 April 1999	list
(49677) 1999 TB_{3}	4 October 1999	list
49777 Cappi	2 December 1999	list
(50034) 2000 AJ_{48}	6 January 2000	list
(50234) 2000 BP	27 January 2000	list

(50270) 2000 CJ	2 February 2000	list
(50602) 2000 EM_{50}	10 March 2000	list
(50863) 2000 GN_{1}	4 April 2000	list
(52541) 1996 VB	1 November 1996	list
(52548) 1996 XD_{2}	3 December 1996	list
(52567) 1997 HN_{2}	28 April 1997	list
(52610) 1997 UK_{1}	23 October 1997	list
(52612) 1997 UH_{5}	27 October 1997	list
(52769) 1998 OF_{4}	26 July 1998	list
(53249) 1999 DD_{3}	20 February 1999	list
(53320) 1999 JW_{8}	14 May 1999	list
(53574) 2000 CH_{41}	7 February 2000	list
(53740) 2000 EN_{50}	10 March 2000	list
(53741) 2000 ER_{50}	10 March 2000	list
(53841) 2000 FX	26 March 2000	list
(54100) 2000 HL_{5}	28 April 2000	list
(54101) 2000 HM_{5}	28 April 2000	list
(54102) 2000 HN_{5}	28 April 2000	list
(54232) 2000 JL_{15}	9 May 2000	list
(54327) 2000 KB_{4}	27 May 2000	list
(54400) 2000 LD	1 June 2000	list
(54609) 2000 RN_{36}	4 September 2000	list
(54620) 2000 ST_{8}	23 September 2000	list
(54909) 2001 OP_{81}	29 July 2001	list
(55192) 2001 RN_{2}	8 September 2001	list

(55880) 1997 WS	18 November 1997	list
(55906) 1998 DS_{20}	28 February 1998	list
(56043) 1998 XQ_{11}	14 December 1998	list
(56163) 1999 DE_{3}	22 February 1999	list
(56215) 1999 HH	17 April 1999	list
(56568) 2000 JN_{15}	9 May 2000	list
(56629) 2000 KV	25 May 2000	list
(56676) 2000 LC	1 June 2000	list
(57010) 2000 TP_{1}	3 October 2000	list
(58458) 1996 KP	21 May 1996	list
(58461) 1996 ML	22 June 1996	list
(58558) 1997 LE_{4}	9 June 1997	list
(59095) 1998 WK	16 November 1998	list
(59159) 1998 YX_{7}	24 December 1998	list
(59161) 1998 YL_{10}	27 December 1998	list
(59366) 1999 EE_{3}	12 March 1999	list
(59367) 1999 EQ_{3}	15 March 1999	list
(59730) 1999 LW	7 June 1999	list
(59832) 1999 RW_{36}	13 September 1999	list
(60667) 2000 GQ_{1}	4 April 2000	list
(61062) 2000 LF_{2}	3 June 2000	list
(61067) 2000 LQ_{6}	6 June 2000	list
(61068) 2000 LR_{6}	6 June 2000	list
(61130) 2000 NK	2 July 2000	list
(61133) 2000 NL_{2}	5 July 2000	list

(61191) 2000 OA	21 July 2000	list
(61193) 2000 OQ_{1}	26 July 2000	list
(61383) 2000 QB	20 August 2000	list
(62031) 2000 RS_{56}	5 September 2000	list
(62138) 2000 SO_{8}	22 September 2000	list
(65830) 1996 XA	1 December 1996	list
(65868) 1997 RR_{5}	8 September 1997	list
(66453) 1999 PC	3 August 1999	list
(67283) 2000 GN	2 April 2000	list
(67285) 2000 GH_{2}	5 April 2000	list
(67540) 2000 SX_{10}	24 September 2000	list
(68263) 2001 EW_{12}	14 March 2001	list
(69430) 1996 GA_{1}	15 April 1996	list
(69451) 1996 TD_{5}	8 October 1996	list
(69493) 1997 AO_{12}	11 January 1997	list
(69545) 1997 JF_{10}	11 May 1997	list
(69559) 1997 UG_{5}	27 October 1997	list
(69686) 1998 HR_{23}	28 April 1998	list
(69749) 1998 MZ_{1}	21 June 1998	list
(69760) 1998 PR	15 August 1998	list
(69762) 1998 QS_{5}	23 August 1998	list
(69837) 1998 SE_{4}	19 September 1998	list
(69932) 1998 UK	16 October 1998	list
(70015) 1998 YT_{5}	19 December 1998	list
(70017) 1998 YL_{9}	26 December 1998	list

(70407) 1999 SE_{1}	18 September 1999	list
(70431) 1999 TD_{3}	4 October 1999	list
(70452) 1999 TH_{19}	15 October 1999	list
(71220) 1999 YY_{8}	31 December 1999	list
(71235) 2000 AD_{3}	4 January 2000	list
(72520) 2001 DB_{88}	24 February 2001	list
(72831) 2001 HJ_{14}	23 April 2001	list
(73868) 1997 AD_{6}	1 January 1997	list
(73923) 1997 MU_{1}	30 June 1997	list
(73993) 1998 FZ_{4}	22 March 1998	list
(74056) 1998 KM_{9}	28 May 1998	list
(74068) 1998 MJ_{4}	22 June 1998	list
(74587) 1999 ON_{1}	21 July 1999	list
(74597) 1999 RG	3 September 1999	list
(75247) 1999 XJ	1 December 1999	list
(75271) 1999 XE_{16}	7 December 1999	list
(75449) 1999 XH_{137}	15 December 1999	list
(75572) 2000 AO_{6}	4 January 2000	list
(75744) 2000 AF_{151}	10 January 2000	list
(75760) 2000 AP_{168}	12 January 2000	list
(75851) 2000 CF	1 February 2000	list
(76200) 2000 EL_{50}	10 March 2000	list
(76638) 2000 HS_{14}	29 April 2000	list
(77158) 2001 EN_{15}	15 March 2001	list
(77179) 2001 FV_{4}	19 March 2001	list

(77869) 2001 SA	16 September 2001	list
(79341) 1996 UT_{1}	30 October 1996	list
(79357) 1997 CP_{4}	4 February 1997	list
(79408) 1997 JE_{8}	8 May 1997	list
(79443) 1997 UL_{1}	23 October 1997	list
(79528) 1998 QG	17 August 1998	list
(79872) 1998 YU_{7}	24 December 1998	list
(79873) 1998 YJ_{10}	27 December 1998	list
(80447) 1999 YQ_{14}	31 December 1999	list
(80614) 2000 AO_{168}	12 January 2000	list
(80632) 2000 AL_{205}	15 January 2000	list
(80693) 2000 CH	1 February 2000	list
(80694) 2000 CN	2 February 2000	list
(80695) 2000 CP	2 February 2000	list
(80780) 2000 CM_{77}	8 February 2000	list
(80973) 2000 EQ	3 March 2000	list
(80974) 2000 ER	3 March 2000	list
(81037) 2000 EN_{55}	11 March 2000	list
(81294) 2000 GM	2 April 2000	list
(81297) 2000 GR_{1}	4 April 2000	list
(81674) 2000 JC	2 May 2000	list
(81679) 2000 JB_{4}	4 May 2000	list
(81796) 2000 KH	23 May 2000	list
(81887) 2000 LS_{22}	9 June 2000	list
(85426) 1997 AK_{12}	10 January 1997	list

(85430) 1997 BW_{5}	31 January 1997	list
(85488) 1997 SH_{2}	23 September 1997	list
(85949) 1999 EX_{14}	10 March 1999	list
(86205) 1999 TC_{3}	4 October 1999	list
(86455) 2000 CF_{41}	6 February 2000	list
(86549) 2000 EG	2 March 2000	list
(86707) 2000 GJ	2 April 2000	list
(86814) 2000 GB_{133}	13 April 2000	list
(87033) 2000 KK	24 May 2000	list
(87034) 2000 KT_{1}	26 May 2000	list
(87125) 2000 MS_{1}	25 June 2000	list
(87130) 2000 NE	1 July 2000	list
(88388) 2001 QT_{2}	16 August 2001	list
(88638) 2001 RL_{46}	13 September 2001	list
(90861) 1996 JD	7 May 1996	list
(90864) 1996 RJ_{1}	9 September 1996	list
(90886) 1996 YT_{2}	18 December 1996	list
(90943) 1997 UX_{2}	24 October 1997	list
(91149) 1998 PS	15 August 1998	list
(91394) 1999 LM	6 June 1999	list
(91430) 1999 RL	4 September 1999	list
(91432) 1999 RF_{1}	4 September 1999	list
(91588) 1999 TJ	2 October 1999	list
(91591) 1999 TJ_{3}	4 October 1999	list
(91595) 1999 TZ_{9}	9 October 1999	list

(91846) 1999 UY_{3}	31 October 1999	list
(92281) 2000 DS_{8}	29 February 2000	list
(92301) 2000 FG	25 March 2000	list
(92350) 2000 HK_{5}	28 April 2000	list
(92354) 2000 HR_{14}	29 April 2000	list
(92495) 2000 NY	4 July 2000	list
(92613) 2000 QO	21 August 2000	list
(93051) 2000 SP_{8}	22 September 2000	list
(93484) 2000 TP_{22}	5 October 2000	list
(94319) 2001 FX_{100}	17 March 2001	list
(96299) 1996 SO	18 September 1996	list
(96314) 1997 AL_{6}	8 January 1997	list
(96415) 1998 FX_{4}	22 March 1998	list
(96492) 1998 KL_{9}	28 May 1998	list
(96634) 1999 GF_{2}	9 April 1999	list
(96652) 1999 HA	16 April 1999	list
(96875) 1999 TE_{10}	8 October 1999	list
(97033) 1999 UW_{3}	31 October 1999	list
(97196) 1999 XR_{1}	3 December 1999	list
(97270) 1999 XK_{137}	15 December 1999	list
(97678) 2000 GS_{1}	4 April 2000	list
(97778) 2000 KG_{41}	31 May 2000	list
(97831) 2000 PN_{5}	5 August 2000	list
(97832) 2000 PQ_{5}	5 August 2000	list
(98070) 2000 RQ_{53}	5 September 2000	list

(98551) 2000 WK_{1}	18 November 2000	list
(98967) 2001 DT_{2}	16 February 2001	list
99201 Sattler	25 April 2001	list
(100444) 1996 RK_{1}	9 September 1996	list
(100457) 1996 TJ_{3}	7 October 1996	list
(100486) 1996 VH_{1}	7 November 1996	list
(100497) 1996 XB	1 December 1996	list
(100564) 1997 GU_{27}	9 April 1997	list
(100631) 1997 UH_{8}	29 October 1997	list
(101172) 1998 SF_{4}	19 September 1998	list
(101196) 1998 SM_{26}	24 September 1998	list
(101362) 1998 UP	17 October 1998	list
(101364) 1998 US	18 October 1998	list
(101533) 1998 YK_{9}	26 December 1998	list
(101613) 1999 CX_{8}	12 February 1999	list
(101614) 1999 CY_{8}	12 February 1999	list
(101718) 1999 EB	6 March 1999	list
(101719) 1999 EF	10 March 1999	list
(101894) 1999 PD_{2}	9 August 1999	list
(101895) 1999 PE_{3}	11 August 1999	list
(101896) 1999 PM_{3}	12 August 1999	list
(102227) 1999 TB_{14}	13 October 1999	list
(103019) 1999 XG_{106}	11 December 1999	list
(103423) 2000 AM_{153}	11 January 2000	list
(103574) 2000 CR	3 February 2000	list

(103575) 2000 CS	3 February 2000	list
(103655) 2000 CC_{41}	6 February 2000	list
(104114) 2000 EO_{50}	10 March 2000	list
(104445) 2000 GA_{4}	7 April 2000	list
(104644) 2000 GG_{123}	11 April 2000	list
(104913) 2000 JK_{15}	9 May 2000	list
(104995) 2000 KJ	23 May 2000	list
(105000) 2000 KZ_{3}	27 May 2000	list
(105227) 2000 PO_{5}	5 August 2000	list
(105379) 2000 QR_{130}	31 August 2000	list
(105632) 2000 SQ_{8}	22 September 2000	list
(106539) 2000 WA_{66}	28 November 2000	list
(107371) 2001 CN_{31}	12 February 2001	list
(107401) 2001 DS_{2}	16 February 2001	list
(109644) 2001 RO_{2}	9 September 2001	list
(109661) 2001 RQ_{16}	12 September 2001	list
(111830) 2002 EO_{9}	14 March 2002	list
(118242) 1997 NM_{3}	9 July 1997	list
(118288) 1998 SK_{4}	20 September 1998	list
(118477) 2000 AQ_{168}	12 January 2000	list
(118570) 2000 GP_{1}	4 April 2000	list
(120660) 1996 VA	1 November 1996	list
(120680) 1997 BT_{5}	31 January 1997	list
(121205) 1999 PG_{1}	8 August 1999	list
(121333) 1999 TF_{3}	4 October 1999	list

(121340) 1999 TO_{17}	15 October 1999	list
(121706) 1999 XE_{95}	9 December 1999	list
(121709) 1999 XJ_{106}	11 December 1999	list
(121760) 1999 YY_{4}	28 December 1999	list
(121762) 1999 YW_{8}	30 December 1999	list
(121805) 2000 AS_{168}	12 January 2000	list
(121953) 2000 EP_{50}	10 March 2000	list
(121954) 2000 EQ_{50}	10 March 2000	list
(122044) 2000 GQ_{82}	9 April 2000	list
(122162) 2000 KX_{1}	26 May 2000	list
(122228) 2000 OA_{2}	27 July 2000	list
(122229) 2000 OC_{2}	27 July 2000	list
(122273) 2000 PT_{1}	3 August 2000	list
(122383) 2000 QW_{70}	26 August 2000	list
(124176) 2001 OJ_{32}	24 July 2001	list
(129548) 1996 TC_{7}	11 October 1996	list
(129589) 1997 UD	20 October 1997	list
(129754) 1999 EE	9 March 1999	list
(130240) 2000 CD_{41}	6 February 2000	list
(130245) 2000 CO_{77}	8 February 2000	list
(130281) 2000 EM	2 March 2000	list
(130779) 2000 TQ_{1}	3 October 2000	list
(131247) 2001 FU_{4}	19 March 2001	list
(132163) 2002 EM_{9}	14 March 2002	list
(134406) 1998 BF	17 January 1998	list

(134579) 1999 TC_{14}	13 October 1999	list
(134761) 2000 CN_{77}	8 February 2000	list
(135240) 2001 SJ_{10}	19 September 2001	list
(136769) 1996 OD	18 July 1996	list
(136785) 1996 XC_{2}	3 December 1996	list
(136799) 1997 CP_{5}	6 February 1997	list
(136991) 1998 SA_{36}	28 September 1998	list
(137153) 1999 EC	6 March 1999	list
(137203) 1999 LX	7 June 1999	list
(137312) 1999 TK_{10}	10 October 1999	list
(137313) 1999 TR_{12}	12 October 1999	list
(137820) 2000 AL_{6}	4 January 2000	list
(137849) 2000 AY_{50}	6 January 2000	list
(138675) 2000 SU_{8}	23 September 2000	list
(147998) 1996 VC_{5}	12 November 1996	list
(148014) 1997 VX_{1}	5 November 1997	list
(148101) 1999 RD_{33}	8 September 1999	list
(148304) 2000 KF_{41}	31 May 2000	list
(150153) 1997 AB	1 January 1997	list
(150346) 1999 YX_{4}	28 December 1999	list
(150393) 2000 EN	2 March 2000	list
(150492) 2000 QZ_{70}	26 August 2000	list
(152642) 1997 RV_{9}	10 September 1997	list
(155520) 1999 TH_{10}	8 October 1999	list
(155587) 2000 AN_{205}	15 January 2000	list

(155592) 2000 CK	2 February 2000	list
(155634) 2000 GJ_{2}	5 April 2000	list
(155677) 2000 JE_{2}	3 May 2000	list
(157966) 2000 GY_{3}	6 April 2000	list
(157999) 2000 OE_{9}	30 July 2000	list
(162042) 1996 OR	22 July 1996	list
(162051) 1996 TE_{1}	5 October 1996	list
(162061) 1997 CH_{22}	13 February 1997	list
(162090) 1998 PP	15 August 1998	list
(162213) 1999 TL_{3}	4 October 1999	list
(162909) 2001 KQ_{41}	24 May 2001	list
(165068) 2000 FV	26 March 2000	list
(165151) 2000 QT_{33}	26 August 2000	list
(168360) 1996 PC	6 August 1996	list
(168674) 2000 FC	24 March 2000	list
(168722) 2000 LH	1 June 2000	list
(171492) 1996 VK_{1}	7 November 1996	list
(173155) 1996 RP	8 September 1996	list
(173158) 1996 TJ_{1}	6 October 1996	list
(173372) 2000 AM_{205}	15 January 2000	list
(173446) 2000 OH_{9}	30 July 2000	list
(173596) 2001 DC_{48}	19 February 2001	list
(175708) 1996 RF_{1}	9 September 1996	list
(175743) 1998 OS_{1}	24 July 1998	list
(175772) 1998 XU_{8}	13 December 1998	list

(176229) 2001 QL_{150}	26 August 2001	list
(178363) 1997 AG_{6}	8 January 1997	list
(178686) 2000 ST_{10}	24 September 2000	list
(181879) 1999 PE_{2}	9 August 1999	list
(185900) 2000 SV_{1}	19 September 2000	list
(185901) 2000 SU_{10}	24 September 2000	list
(186643) 2003 MS_{7}	28 June 2003	list
(187851) 2000 AG_{151}	11 January 2000	list
(189451) 1999 ED	9 March 1999	list
(192948) 2000 BA	16 January 2000	list
(193060) 2000 GL	2 April 2000	list
(193103) 2000 GD_{123}	11 April 2000	list
(193150) 2000 JU_{8}	7 May 2000	list
(193167) 2000 KK_{41}	31 May 2000	list
(193172) 2000 LN_{8}	7 June 2000	list
(200282) 1999 YB_{5}	28 December 1999	list
(200362) 2000 QL	21 August 2000	list
(203029) 2000 BR	28 January 2000	list
(203242) 2001 OA_{36}	24 July 2001	list
(205205) 2000 FA_{1}	26 March 2000	list
(205220) 2000 PP_{27}	5 August 2000	list
(205835) 2002 EN_{9}	14 March 2002	list
(208036) 1999 RR_{43}	14 September 1999	list
(208170) 2000 QG	21 August 2000	list
(208301) 2001 FY_{100}	17 March 2001	list

(210485) 1996 TK	3 October 1996	list
(210549) 1999 TG_{3}	4 October 1999	list
(210550) 1999 TH_{3}	4 October 1999	list
(210642) 2000 GL_{137}	14 April 2000	list
(216977) 2000 OA_{1}	25 July 2000	list
(219317) 2000 FZ_{7}	30 March 2000	list
(219491) 2001 FK_{1}	18 March 2001	list
(221985) 1997 BR_{5}	31 January 1997	list
(222234) 2000 GV_{132}	12 April 2000	list
(225427) 2000 BF_{1}	28 January 2000	list
(225430) 2000 CG	1 February 2000	list
(228321) 2000 QQ_{130}	31 August 2000	list
(229961) 1999 TS_{12}	12 October 1999	list
(231688) 1996 VG_{1}	7 November 1996	list
(234078) 1999 TO_{12}	12 October 1999	list
(234171) 2000 LB_{28}	10 June 2000	list
(234174) 2000 OJ_{2}	28 July 2000	list
(237388) 1996 TL	3 October 1996	list
(237494) 2000 QV_{33}	26 August 2000	list
(239807) 1996 PG	7 August 1996	list
(239876) 2000 NW	4 July 2000	list
(241588) 1997 RK_{1}	1 September 1997	list
(241647) 2000 EL	2 March 2000	list
(241711) 2000 TD	1 October 2000	list
(244328) 2002 JL_{5}	5 May 2002	list

(249688) 2000 CL	2 February 2000	list
(249809) 2001 CL_{31}	12 February 2001	list
(251705) 1996 UJ	17 October 1996	list
(252024) 2000 KS	25 May 2000	list
(252049) 2000 SS_{10}	24 September 2000	list
(252163) 2001 CM_{31}	12 February 2001	list
(257506) 1996 SN_{7}	23 September 1996	list
(257523) 1997 SH_{11}	30 September 1997	list
(257710) 1999 XD_{115}	12 December 1999	list
(257742) 2000 AE_{151}	10 January 2000	list
(257942) 2000 XN_{15}	4 December 2000	list
(258026) 2001 GQ_{1}	15 April 2001	list
(264346) 1999 XE_{106}	11 December 1999	list
(264348) 1999 XJ_{137}	15 December 1999	list
(267179) 2000 QF_{9}	22 August 2000	list
(267230) 2001 HW_{13}	18 April 2001	list
(269628) 2011 AN_{23}	31 January 1997	list
(269694) 1996 UF_{3}	31 October 1996	list
(269914) 2000 JV_{8}	7 May 2000	list
(269943) 2000 SV_{10}	24 September 2000	list
(270036) 2001 KR_{41}	24 May 2001	list
(275514) 1996 LU	12 June 1996	list
(275515) 1996 TM	3 October 1996	list
(279873) 2001 OR_{67}	27 July 2001	list
(280120) 2002 JM_{5}	5 May 2002	list

(280121) 2002 JG_{9}	7 May 2002	list
(282081) 2000 NG	1 July 2000	list
(285215) 1997 EG_{6}	6 March 1997	list
(285584) 2000 QN_{68}	26 August 2000	list
(285639) 2000 SW_{10}	24 September 2000	list
(297521) 2001 CE	1 February 2001	list
(301987) 2000 NS	3 July 2000	list
(306313) 2011 SA_{84}	7 October 1996	list
(306582) 2000 FW	26 March 2000	list
(306607) 2000 OD_{2}	27 July 2000	list
(313038) 2000 QH	21 August 2000	list
(316361) 2010 SM_{2}	29 July 2000	list
(316706) 1996 XA_{20}	12 December 1996	list
(316755) 1999 RZ_{35}	12 September 1999	list
(322330) 2011 HV_{8}	14 March 2001	list
(322711) 2000 HQ_{20}	30 April 2000	list
(326288) 1997 UQ_{9}	30 October 1997	list
(326374) 2000 XO_{15}	4 December 2000	list
(331120) 2010 UJ_{75}	12 November 1996	list
(333152) 2012 BC_{30}	6 October 1996	list
(337049) 1996 VX_{2}	11 November 1996	list
(347375) 2012 RL_{12}	3 October 1996	list
(350065) 2011 GT_{9}	18 September 1996	list
(350480) 1999 SB	16 September 1999	list
(350531) 2000 KE	23 May 2000	list

(357000) 1998 UO	17 October 1998	list
(362697) 2011 UJ_{152}	1 June 1997	list
(363077) 2000 QK	21 August 2000	list
(379898) 2012 JG_{4}	2 September 2000	list
(382407) 1996 TE_{5}	8 October 1996	list
(382448) 2000 KU_{1}	26 May 2000	list
(382486) 2001 CX_{19}	3 February 2001	list
(382498) 2001 QM_{150}	26 August 2001	list
(385107) 2012 VM_{92}	12 November 1996	list
(385190) 1996 XK_{2}	4 December 1996	list
(385206) 1999 TM_{10}	11 October 1999	list
(385228) 2000 KV_{33}	29 May 2000	list
(390195) 2012 WG_{26}	16 August 2001	list
(395526) 2011 UZ_{139}	5 October 2000	list
(399573) 2003 SP_{221}	29 September 2003	list
(401634) 2013 GA_{82}	2 February 2000	list
(412075) 2013 EU_{120}	29 May 2000	list
(413011) 2000 FY_{7}	30 March 2000	list
(413243) 2003 SC_{215}	26 September 2003	list
(415721) 1999 SC	16 September 1999	list
(422697) 2000 OG_{9}	30 July 2000	list
(430460) 2001 EO_{15}	15 March 2001	list
(437762) 2014 JD_{61}	4 January 2001	list
(439738) 2015 FD_{213}	22 July 2000	list
(443857) 2001 SB_{4}	18 September 2001	list

(450153) 2000 AL_{48}	6 January 2000	list
(451855) 2014 DD_{74}	23 April 2001	list
(452303) 1996 RL_{1}	9 September 1996	list
(455201) 2001 CW_{19}	2 February 2001	list
(469304) 1998 UV_{1}	20 October 1998	list
(472653) 2015 DD_{218}	25 July 1998	list
(474159) 1999 RJ	3 September 1999	list
(496836) 1998 OL_{2}	25 July 1998	list
(496866) 2000 JO_{5}	5 May 2000	list
(503863) 1999 SU_{3}	21 September 1999	list
(524059) 2000 EM_{55}	11 March 2000	list
(524092) 2000 OL_{2}	28 July 2000	list
(524110) 2000 RO_{36}	2 September 2000	list
(524949) 2004 HR_{74}	10 May 2000	list
(539232) 2016 OQ_{4}	30 June 1997	list
(641328) 2003 SD_{215}	26 September 2003	list
(722759) 2006 BV_{111}	28 August 2000	list
(826918) 1996 TH_{1}	6 October 1996	list
(827097) 1999 XF_{106}	11 December 1999	list
(827149) 2000 QS_{130}	31 August 2000	list
(827204) 2000 TE	1 October 2000	list
(827252) 2001 FW_{32}	23 March 2001	list
(834246) 2010 NM_{95}	3 September 1999	list
(846371) 2019 NZ_{28}	9 July 1997	list
(877985) 2011 RD_{11}	26 August 1998	list
