= 485 Genua =

Main-belt asteroid

Discovery
- Discovered by: Luigi Carnera
- Discovery site: Heidelberg
- Discovery date: 7 May 1902

Designations
- Pronunciation: /ˈdʒɛnjuə/
- Alternative designations: 1902 HZ

Orbital characteristics
- Epoch 31 July 2016 (JD 2457600.5)
- Uncertainty parameter 0
- Observation arc: 111.54 yr (40740 d)
- Aphelion: 3.2774 AU (490.29 Gm)
- Perihelion: 2.2180 AU (331.81 Gm)
- Semi-major axis: 2.7477 AU (411.05 Gm)
- Eccentricity: 0.19278
- Orbital period (sidereal): 4.55 yr (1663.6 d)
- Mean anomaly: 117.881°
- Mean motion: 0° 12^{m} 59.04^{s} / day
- Inclination: 13.868°
- Longitude of ascending node: 193.440°
- Argument of perihelion: 272.535°

Physical characteristics
- Dimensions: 56.31 ± 4.15 km (composite estimate); 63.88±2.9 km
- Mass: (5.2±2.5)×10^{17} kg (Note: Calculated from its standard gravitational parameter GM = 0.035±0.017 km^{3}/s^{2}.)
- Mean density: 3.85 g/cm^{3} (Note: Assuming a diameter of 63.9 km.)
- Synodic rotation period: 17.59 h (0.733 d)
- Geometric albedo: 0.2072±0.020
- Absolute magnitude (H): 8.2

485 Genua is a minor planet orbiting the Sun.
