= 808 Merxia =

Main-belt asteroid

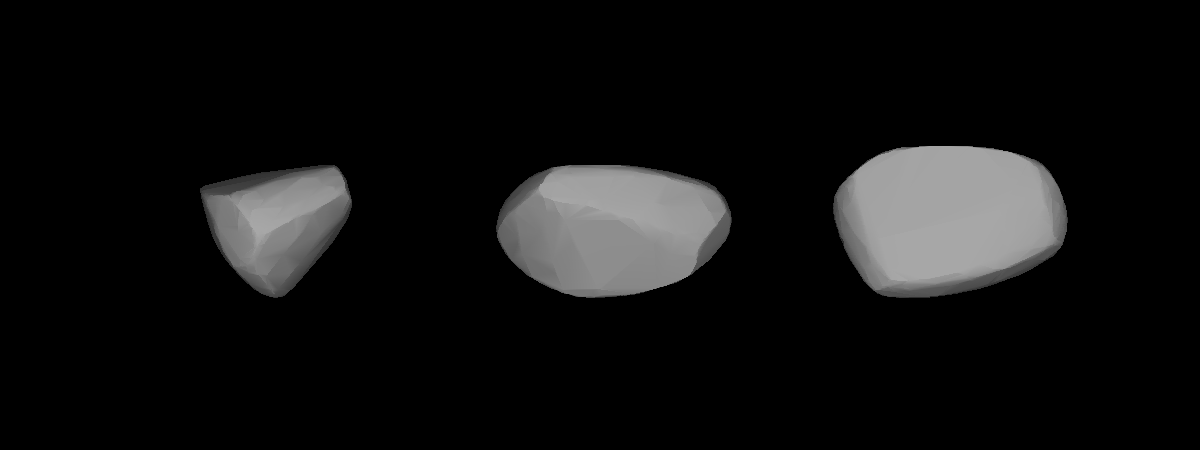
- Lightcurve-based 3D-model of Merxia

Discovery
- Discovered by: Luigi Carnera
- Discovery site: Heidelberg Observatory
- Discovery date: 11 October 1901

Designations
- Alternative designations: 1901 GY
- Minor planet category: main belt; Merxia

Orbital characteristics
- Epoch 31 July 2016 (JD 2457600.5)
- Uncertainty parameter 0
- Observation arc: 114.45 yr (41803 d)
- Aphelion: 3.0921 AU (462.57 Gm)
- Perihelion: 2.3990 AU (358.89 Gm)
- Semi-major axis: 2.7456 AU (410.74 Gm)
- Eccentricity: 0.12621
- Orbital period (sidereal): 4.55 yr (1661.7 d)
- Mean anomaly: 11.0596°
- Mean motion: 0° 12^{m} 59.94^{s} / day
- Inclination: 4.7240°
- Longitude of ascending node: 181.066°
- Argument of perihelion: 274.396°
- Earth MOID: 1.41983 AU (212.404 Gm)
- Jupiter MOID: 2.09197 AU (312.954 Gm)
- T_{Jupiter}: 3.331

Physical characteristics
- Mean radius: 16.245±1.15 km
- Synodic rotation period: 30.631 h (1.2763 d)
- Geometric albedo: 0.2207±0.035
- Spectral type: S-type asteroid
- Absolute magnitude (H): 9.8

808 Merxia is a minor planet orbiting the Sun. It forms the namesake for the Merxia family of asteroids that share common orbital elements and physical properties. A semimajor axis of 2.75 AU with a moderate orbital eccentricity of 0.126 carries it from 2.40 to 3.09 AU away from the Sun with a period of 4.55 years. Its orbital plane is inclined at an angle of 4.7° relative to the plane of the ecliptic.

The spectrum of this object indicates that it is an S-type asteroid with both low and high calcium forms of pyroxene on the surface, along with less than 20% olivine. The high-calcium form of pyroxene forms 40% or more of the total pyroxene present, indicating a history of igneous rock deposits. This suggests that the asteroid underwent differentiation by melting, creating a surface of basalt rock.

808 Merxia is the namesake of the Merxia family of asteroids that share similar orbital elements and physical properties. The members of this family, including 808 Merxia, most likely formed from the breakup of a basalt object, which in turn was spawned from a larger parent body that had previously undergone igneous differentiation. Other members of this family include 1662 Hoffmann and 2042 Sitarski.
