= Brivius de Brokles =

Hungarian and Italian noble family

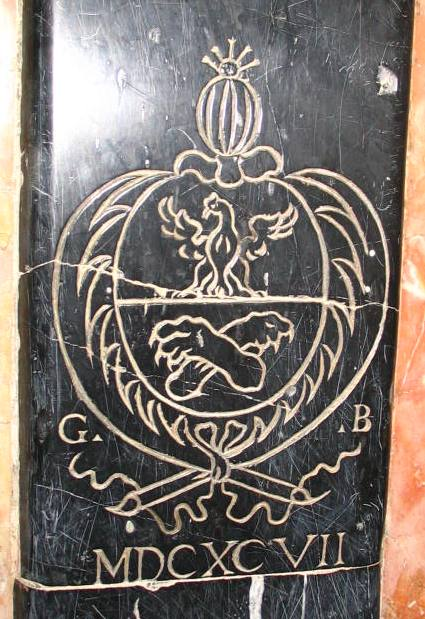
Coat of arms of the Brivio de Brokles family in the Church of Montevecchia

The Brivio de Brokles (in Latin and Hungarian: Brivius de Brokles) were a Hungarian and Italian noble family, supposed to be a branch of the more famous Brivio family from Milan.

== Origins ==
Founder of the family was Pietro Brivio (in Latin: Petrus Brivius or Petrus de Brippio), who moved at the end of the 15th Century from Milan to Montevecchia, where he had bought many properties. According to some historians, he was supposed to belong to the Brivio family of Milan, which was said to descend from the Brunonen family.

The family rose to significant influence in Brianza at the end of the 17th century, when a member of this family, Francesco (+ before 1679), became very rich with silk trading. At the beginning of the 18th century his son, Giacomo (1660ca. + 1736), financed the War of the Spanish Succession and Joseph I, Holy Roman Emperor rewarded him with the title of Count of Brokles (in Italian: Brochles) in 1708. Brokles was a small county in the Kingdom of Hungary, but nowadays it is located in Serbia.

== Giacomo Brivio ==
Thanks to his richness, Count Giacomo Brivio lent money to many notable people of his time. In 1710 he was fideiussor of Cosimo III de' Medici, Grand Duke of Tuscany. In 1713 Giacomo became Lord of Montevecchia, the village of his ancestors, and in 1716 famous composer Antonio Vivaldi dedicated him a dramma per musica, Arsilda, regina di Ponto.

== Other notable members ==
Giacomo Brivio had two notable sons. Francesco (1680 + 1732) married Elena Attendolo Bolognini, member of an important noble family from Milan and descendant (by mother, Cecilia Medici di Marignano) from Pope Pius IV and Gian Giacomo Medici. The marriage was of course very important for the Brivio family. Carlo (1684 + 1746) was Lieutenant Colonel in the Austrian Army from 1709. His only daughter, Anna (1742 + 1784), married an Irish nobleman called David Griffith. Another notable member of this family was Giuseppe Ferdinando Brivio (+ 1758), who was a famous composer and music teacher in Milan. Finally, Anna Fortunato Brivio (1699 + 1732) married Pietro Agnesi and was mother of the famous mathematician Maria Gaetana Agnesi.

== See also ==
- List of titled noble families in the Kingdom of Hungary

== Literature ==
- Annibale Brivio Sforza, Notizie Storico Genealogiche della Famiglia Brivio .
- Sironi, Monte delle Vedette in Brianza
- Felice Calvi, Famiglie Notabili Milanesi
