= 486 Cremona =

Main-belt asteroid

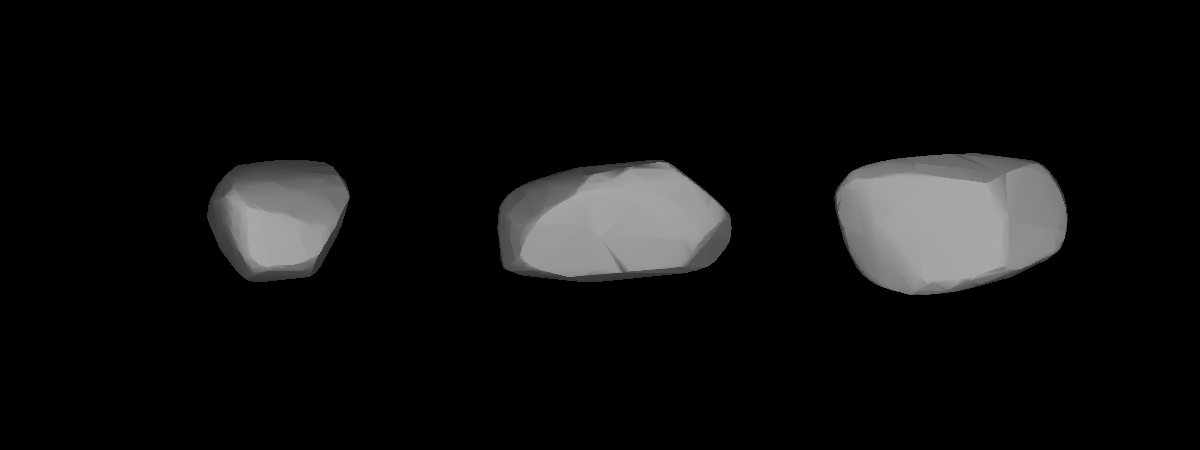
- A three-dimensional model of 486 Cremona based on its light curve.

Discovery
- Discovered by: Luigi Carnera
- Discovery site: Heidelberg
- Discovery date: 11 May 1902

Designations
- Pronunciation: /krɪˈmoʊnə/
- Alternative designations: 1902 JB

Orbital characteristics
- Epoch 31 July 2016 (JD 2457600.5)
- Uncertainty parameter 0
- Observation arc: 113.79 yr (41560 d)
- Aphelion: 2.7337 AU (408.96 Gm)
- Perihelion: 1.9702 AU (294.74 Gm)
- Semi-major axis: 2.3520 AU (351.85 Gm)
- Eccentricity: 0.16231
- Orbital period (sidereal): 3.61 yr (1317.5 d)
- Mean anomaly: 251.569°
- Mean motion: 0° 16^{m} 23.7^{s} / day
- Inclination: 11.091°
- Longitude of ascending node: 94.246°
- Argument of perihelion: 124.656°

Physical characteristics
- Mean radius: 10.925±0.6 km
- Synodic rotation period: 65.15 h (2.715 d)
- Geometric albedo: 0.1631±0.019
- Absolute magnitude (H): 11.1

486 Cremona is a minor planet orbiting the Sun.
