= 9903 Leonhardt =

Asteroid

- Orbit of Leonhardt (blue), with the inner planets and Jupiter (outermost)

Discovery
- Discovered by: P. G. Comba
- Discovery site: Prescott Obs.
- Discovery date: 4 July 1997

Designations
- Named after: Gustav Leonhardt (conductor and harpsichordist)
- Alternative designations: 1997 NA_{1} · 1976 UG_{6}
- Minor planet category: main-belt · (outer)

Orbital characteristics
- Epoch 4 September 2017 (JD 2458000.5)
- Uncertainty parameter 0
- Observation arc: 40.43 yr (14,767 days)
- Aphelion: 3.8232 AU
- Perihelion: 2.3527 AU
- Semi-major axis: 3.0880 AU
- Eccentricity: 0.2381
- Orbital period (sidereal): 5.43 yr (1,982 days)
- Mean anomaly: 240.21°
- Mean motion: 0° 10^{m} 53.76^{s} / day
- Inclination: 1.6903°
- Longitude of ascending node: 195.95°
- Argument of perihelion: 139.13°

Physical characteristics
- Dimensions: 8.499±0.240 km 17.8 km
- Geometric albedo: 0.042±0.008
- Absolute magnitude (H): 14.5

9903 Leonhardt, provisional designation 1997 NA_{1}, is a dark asteroid from the outer region of the asteroid belt, approximately 10 kilometers in diameter.

The asteroid was discovered on 4 July 1997, by American amateur astronomer Paul Comba at Prescott Observatory in Arizona, United States. It was named after Dutch keyboard player Gustav Leonhardt.

== Orbit and classification ==
Leonhardt orbits the Sun in the outer main-belt at a distance of 2.4–3.8 AU once every 5 years and 5 months (1,982 days). Its orbit has an eccentricity of 0.24 and an inclination of 2° with respect to the ecliptic.

It was first identified as 1976 UG_{6} at Kiso Observatory in 1976, extending the body's observation arc by 21 years prior to its official discovery observation at Prescott.

== Physical characteristics ==
=== Diameter and albedo ===
According to the surveys carried out by the Infrared Astronomical Satellite IRAS and NASA's Wide-field Infrared Survey Explorer with its subsequent NEOWISE mission, Leonhardt measures 17.8 and 8.499 kilometers in diameter, respectively. WISE/NEOWISE also gives an albedo of 0.042 for the body's surface. It has an absolute magnitude of 14.5.

=== Lightcurves ===
As of 2017, the asteroid's rotation period and shape remain unknown.

== Naming ==
This minor planet was named for Gustav Leonhardt (1928–2012), a Dutch conductor and harpsichordist, who founded the Leonhardt Baroque Ensemble. He was known for his many international concert tours and for his large number of recorded baroque works. The official naming citation was published by the Minor Planet Center on 2 April 1999 (M.P.C. 34356).

The main-belt asteroid 12637 Gustavleonhardt, discovered during the second Palomar–Leiden Trojan survey campaign in 1973, is also named in his honor.
