= 470 Kilia =

Main-belt asteroid

Discovery
- Discovered by: Luigi Carnera
- Discovery site: Heidelberg Observatory
- Discovery date: 21 April 1901

Designations
- Pronunciation: /ˈkɪliə/
- Named after: Kiel
- Alternative designations: 1901 GJ; A902 RB
- Minor planet category: Main belt

Orbital characteristics
- Epoch 31 May 2020 (JD 2459000.5)
- Observation arc: 114.99 yr (42001 d)
- Aphelion: 2.633 AU (393.9 Gm)
- Perihelion: 2.179 AU (326.0 Gm)
- Semi-major axis: 2.405 AU (359.8 Gm)
- Eccentricity: 0.0939
- Orbital period (sidereal): 3.73 yr (1362.0 d)
- Mean anomaly: 328.947 °
- Mean motion: 0° 15^{m} 51.089^{s} / day
- Inclination: 7.227°
- Longitude of ascending node: 173.225°
- Argument of perihelion: 47.396°

Proper orbital elements
- Proper semi-major axis: 2.4047 AU
- Proper eccentricity: 0.1225
- Proper inclination: 0.125°
- Proper mean motion: 96.5229 deg / yr
- Proper orbital period: 3.72968 yr (1362.267 d)
- Precession of perihelion long.: 37.748 arcsec / yr
- Precession of asc. node: -42.035 arcsec / yr

Physical characteristics
- Dimensions: 26.39±0.7 km
- Synodic rotation period: 290 h (12 d)
- Geometric albedo: 0.2379±0.014
- Spectral type: S
- Absolute magnitude (H): 10.07

470 Kilia /ˈkɪliə/ (1901 GJ) is a 27 km main-belt asteroid discovered on 21 April 1901 by Luigi Carnera at Heidelberg, the 470th asteroid discovered. It was one of the 16 asteroid discoveries made by Carnera.

Photometric observations of this asteroid in 2021 were used to produce a light curve showing a rotation period of 297.655±0.012 h with a brightness amplitude of 0.40±0.02 in magnitude.
