= 479 Caprera =

Main-belt asteroid

Discovery
- Discovered by: Luigi Carnera
- Discovery site: Heidelberg
- Discovery date: 12 November 1901

Designations
- Pronunciation: Italian: [kaˈprɛːra]
- Alternative designations: 1901 HJ

Orbital characteristics
- Epoch 31 July 2016 (JD 2457600.5)
- Uncertainty parameter 0
- Observation arc: 114.43 yr (41794 d)
- Aphelion: 3.3144 AU (495.83 Gm)
- Perihelion: 2.1251 AU (317.91 Gm)
- Semi-major axis: 2.7197 AU (406.86 Gm)
- Eccentricity: 0.21864
- Orbital period (sidereal): 4.49 yr (1638.3 d)
- Mean anomaly: 201.29°
- Mean motion: 0° 13^{m} 11.064^{s} / day
- Inclination: 8.6824°
- Longitude of ascending node: 136.032°
- Argument of perihelion: 269.913°

Physical characteristics
- Mean radius: 36.49±1.45 km
- Synodic rotation period: 9.43 h (0.393 d)
- Geometric albedo: 0.0480±0.004
- Absolute magnitude (H): 9.7

479 Caprera is a minor planet orbiting the Sun.
