= 469 Argentina =

Main-belt asteroid

Discovery
- Discovered by: Luigi Carnera
- Discovery site: Heidelberg Observatory
- Discovery date: 20 February 1901

Designations
- Pronunciation: /ɑːrdʒənˈtaɪnə/
- Named after: Argentina
- Alternative designations: 1901 GE
- Minor planet category: main belt
- Adjectives: Argentinian /ɑːrdʒənˈtɪniən/

Orbital characteristics
- Epoch 31 July 2016 (JD 2457600.5)
- Uncertainty parameter 0
- Observation arc: 109.08 yr (39840 d)
- Aphelion: 3.68734 AU (551.618 Gm)
- Perihelion: 2.67484 AU (400.150 Gm)
- Semi-major axis: 3.18109 AU (475.884 Gm)
- Eccentricity: 0.159144
- Orbital period (sidereal): 5.67 yr (2072.3 d)
- Mean anomaly: 153.115°
- Mean motion: 0° 10^{m} 25.378^{s} / day
- Inclination: 11.5955°
- Longitude of ascending node: 333.476°
- Argument of perihelion: 209.588°

Physical characteristics
- Mean diameter: 126.00±4.91 km (composite estimate); 125.57±5.6 km
- Mass: (4.53±1.76)×10^{18} kg (composite estimate) (1.96±0.42)×10^{18} kg (Note: Calculated from its standard gravitational parameter GM = 0.131±0.028 km^{3}/s^{2}.)
- Mean density: 4.32±1.75 g/cm^{3} 1.56 g/cm^{3} (Note: Assuming a diameter of 134 km.)
- Synodic rotation period: 12.3 hours; 17.5727 h (0.73220 d)
- Geometric albedo: 0.035±0.005; 0.0399±0.004
- Spectral type: P X
- Absolute magnitude (H): 8.62; 8.65

469 Argentina is an asteroid that was discovered by Luigi Carnera on 20 February 1901. Its provisional name was 1901 GE. 469 Argentina has an estimated rotation period of 12.3 hours.
