= 476 Hedwig =

Main-belt asteroid

Discovery
- Discovered by: Luigi Carnera
- Discovery site: Heidelberg
- Discovery date: 17 August 1901

Designations
- Pronunciation: /ˈhɛdwɪɡ/ German: [ˈheːtvɪç]
- Alternative designations: 1901 GQ
- Minor planet category: Main belt

Orbital characteristics
- Epoch 31 July 2016 (JD 2457600.5)
- Uncertainty parameter 0
- Observation arc: 114.66 yr (41880 d)
- Aphelion: 2.843586228752500 AU (425.39444497321 Gm)
- Perihelion: 2.458818277348141 AU (367.83397872952 Gm)
- Semi-major axis: 2.651202253050 AU (396.6142118513 Gm)
- Eccentricity: 0.07256480545036940
- Orbital period (sidereal): 4.32 yr (1576.7 d)
- Mean anomaly: 277.3588495717540°
- Mean motion: 0° 13^{m} 41.944^{s} / day
- Inclination: 10.92403953516030°
- Longitude of ascending node: 286.3817373411550°
- Argument of perihelion: 0.2030128925787450°

Physical characteristics
- Mean diameter: 116+6 −16 km 122 ± 10 km (alternate pole solution)
- Mass: (1.27±0.19)×10^{18} kg (Note: Calculated from its standard gravitational parameter GM = 0.085±0.013 km^{3}/s^{2}.)
- Mean density: 1.34–1.56 g/cm^{3} (calculated)
- Synodic rotation period: 27.2403 ± 0.0006 h 27.2404 ± 0.0005 h (alternate pole solution)
- Pole ecliptic longitude: 49° ± 4° 218° ± 4° (alternate pole solution)
- Pole ecliptic latitude: 60° ± 7° 36° ± 4° (alternate pole solution)
- Geometric albedo: 0.0493±0.002
- Spectral type: P (Tholen), X (SMASSII)
- Absolute magnitude (H): 8.55

476 Hedwig (1901 GQ) is a main-belt asteroid discovered on 17 August 1901 by Luigi Carnera at Heidelberg. Named in honour of the wife of Swedish-Danish astronomer Elis Strömgren.

== See also ==
- List of Solar System objects by size
