= 466 Tisiphone =

Asteroid

Discovery
- Discovered by: Max Wolf; Luigi Carnera
- Discovery site: Heidelberg Observatory
- Discovery date: 17 January 1901

Designations
- Pronunciation: /tɪˈsɪfəniː/
- Named after: Tisiphone
- Alternative designations: 1901 FX
- Minor planet category: Cybele

Orbital characteristics
- Epoch 31 July 2016 (JD 2457600.5)
- Uncertainty parameter 0
- Observation arc: 114.91 yr (41971 d)
- Aphelion: 3.664121719 AU (548.1448071 Gm)
- Perihelion: 3.04594364 AU (455.666683 Gm)
- Semi-major axis: 3.355032678 AU (501.9057448 Gm)
- Eccentricity: 0.092126984
- Orbital period (sidereal): 6.15 yr (2244.6 d)
- Mean anomaly: 199.011026°
- Mean motion: 0° 9^{m} 37.38^{s} / day
- Inclination: 19.1085004°
- Longitude of ascending node: 290.871348°
- Argument of perihelion: 249.614694°

Physical characteristics
- Dimensions: 121 km 115.53±2.2 km
- Mass: (1.6±1.8)×10^{18} kg (Note: Calculated from its standard gravitational parameter GM = 0.11±0.12 km^{3}/s^{2}.) (SB441)
- Mean density: 1.9–2.2 g/cm^{3} (calculated)
- Synodic rotation period: 8.824 ± 0.009 h 8.834 h (0.3681 d)
- Geometric albedo: 0.056; 0.0634±0.002
- Spectral type: C
- Absolute magnitude (H): 8.5

466 Tisiphone is an asteroid which orbits among the Cybele family of asteroids, approximately 116 kilometers in diameter.

== Discovery ==
It was discovered by Max Wolf and Luigi Carnera on January 17, 1901, and was assigned the provisional designation 1901 FX. It was named after Tisiphone of Greek mythology.

== Physical properties ==
A number of positional observations of Tisiphone were carried out in 1907, 1913, and 1914.

In 1992 a simple check of 466 Tisiphone's position was made by the Association of Lunar and Planetary Observers (ALPO). The asteroid was found to be in the expected position to within observational errors. Further checks were carried out in 1996, and 2006 with the asteroid in its expected position both times.

In 1997 Tisiphone was studied by Worman and Christianson at the Feder Observatory located near Minnesota State University, Moorhead, with the goal of determining its rotational period. A period of 8.824 ± 0.009 was arrived at, with the lightcurve data showing two distinct maxima and minima in its rotation.

In 2001 Lagerkvist et al. published their results on a study of the Cybele asteroid family, which includes 466 Tisiphone. Relative photometric observations of Tisiphone were carried out in 1998 and 1999 using the 1.2 m telescope at the Calar Alto Observatory located at the Max-Planck-Institut für Astronomie in Heidelberg, Germany. They were able to confirm the 8.8 hour rotation period obtained by Worman and Christianson.

In 2006 Fornasier et al. published polarimetric data for a number of asteroids, including 466 Tisiphone.
