= 487 Venetia =

Main-belt asteroid

Discovery
- Discovered by: L. Carnera
- Discovery site: Heidelberg Obs.
- Discovery date: 9 July 1902

Designations
- Pronunciation: /vɪˈniːʃə/
- Named after: Veneto (Italian region)
- Alternative designations: 1902 JL
- Minor planet category: main-belt · (middle)

Orbital characteristics
- Epoch 16 February 2017 (JD 2457800.5)
- Uncertainty parameter 0
- Observation arc: 114.63 yr (41,868 days)
- Aphelion: 2.9063 AU
- Perihelion: 2.4333 AU
- Semi-major axis: 2.6698 AU
- Eccentricity: 0.0886
- Orbital period (sidereal): 4.36 yr (1,593 days)
- Mean anomaly: 8.3676°
- Mean motion: 0° 13^{m} 33.24^{s} / day
- Inclination: 10.245°
- Longitude of ascending node: 114.82°
- Argument of perihelion: 280.52°

Physical characteristics
- Mean diameter: 70 ± 4 km
- Synodic rotation period: 13.342±0.002 h
- Pole ecliptic longitude: 70° ± 6° or 255° ± 5°
- Pole ecliptic latitude: 8° ± 11° or 8° ± 10°
- Geometric albedo: 0.21 ± 0.02; 0.2284±0.0421; 0.239±0.008; 0.2457±0.011 (IRAS:22); 0.328±0.043
- Spectral type: B–V = 0.852; U–B = 0.424; Tholen = S · K · S
- Absolute magnitude (H): 8.14

487 Venetia, provisional designation 1902 JL, is a rare-type stony asteroid from the middle regions of the asteroid belt, approximately 63 kilometers in diameter. It was discovered on 9 July 1902, by Italian astronomer Luigi Carnera at Heidelberg Observatory in southwest Germany. It was later named for the Italian Veneto region where the city of Venice is located.

== Orbit and classification ==
Venetia orbits the Sun in the middle main-belt at a distance of 2.4–2.9 AU once every 4 years and 4 months (1,593 days). Its orbit has an eccentricity of 0.09 and an inclination of 10° with respect to the ecliptic. The body's observation arc begins in 1913, at the Collegio Romano Observatory (531) in Italy, approximately 17 months after its official discovery observation at Heidelberg.

== Physical characteristics ==
On the taxonomic scheme, Venetia is a common, featureless S-type asteroid. More recently, polarimetric observations refined its classification to a rare K-type asteroid.

=== Rotation period ===
In March 2014, the so-far best rated rotational lightcurve was obtained by Italian astronomer Andrea Ferrero at the Bigmuskie Observatory (B88) in Mombercelli, Italy. It gave a well-defined rotation period of 13.34 hours with a brightness variation of 0.20 magnitude (U=3). The result supersedes previously measured periods of 10.62 to 18 hours.

=== Spin axis ===
In two separate studies, groups of German, Russian and Swedish astronomers also modeled Venetia's lightcurve from various data sources in 2000 and 2002. They found two spin axes of (259.0°, −30.0°) and (268.0°, −24.0°) in ecliptic coordinates (λ, β), as well as a concurring rotation period of 13.33170 and 13.34153 hours, respectively (U=n.a.).

=== Diameter and albedo ===
According to the surveys carried out by the Infrared Astronomical Satellite IRAS, the Japanese Akari satellite, and NASA's Wide-field Infrared Survey Explorer with its subsequent NEOWISE mission, Venetia measures between 59.046 and 66.13 kilometers in diameter and its surface has an albedo between 0.228 and 0.328. The Collaborative Asteroid Lightcurve Link adopts the results obtained by IRAS, that is, an albedo of 0.2457 and a diameter of 63.15 kilometers with an absolute magnitude of 8.14.

== Naming ==
This minor planet was named for the region of Veneto with its capital and largest city Venice. The region is located in northeast Italy between the Po River and the Alps. Naming was proposed by Italian astronomer Elia Millosevich.

Naming citation was first mentioned in The Names of the Minor Planets by Paul Herget in 1955 (H 52) and amended by Lutz Schmadel for the Dictionary of Minor Planet Names based on a private communication with astronomer Piero Sicoli.
