= 472 Roma =

50-km wide asteroid named after Rome, Italy

Discovery
- Discovered by: Luigi Carnera
- Discovery date: 11 July 1901

Designations
- Pronunciation: /ˈroʊmə/
- Alternative designations: 1901 GP

Orbital characteristics
- Epoch 31 July 2016 (JD 2457600.5)
- Uncertainty parameter 0
- Observation arc: 114.55 yr (41838 d)
- Aphelion: 2.7825 AU (416.26 Gm) (Q)
- Perihelion: 2.3049 AU (344.81 Gm) (q)
- Semi-major axis: 2.5437 AU (380.53 Gm) (a)
- Eccentricity: 0.093876 (e)
- Orbital period (sidereal): 4.06 yr (1481.8 d)
- Mean anomaly: 14.044° (M)
- Mean motion: 0° 14^{m} 34.62^{s} / day (n)
- Inclination: 15.803° (i)
- Longitude of ascending node: 127.177° (Ω)
- Argument of perihelion: 295.56° (ω)

Physical characteristics
- Dimensions: 47.27±3.4 km
- Synodic rotation period: 9.8007 h (0.40836 d)
- Sidereal rotation period: 9.8007 ± 0.0009 h
- Geometric albedo: 0.2138±0.034
- Absolute magnitude (H): 8.92

472 Roma is an asteroid. It was discovered by Luigi Carnera on 11 July 1901. Its provisional name was 1901 GP. This asteroid was named by Antonio Abetti for the city of Rome in Italy, the native country of its discoverer.

At 21:57 UT, on Thursday, 8 July 2010, this 50 km wide asteroid occulted the star Delta Ophiuchi in an event lasting about five seconds. The occultation path crossed central Europe along a band that ran through Stockholm, Copenhagen, Bremen, Nantes and Bilbao.

This is a member of the dynamic Maria family of asteroids that were probably formed as the result of a collisional breakup of a parent body.
