= Maria Gaetana Agnesi =

Italian mathematician and philanthropist (1718–1799)

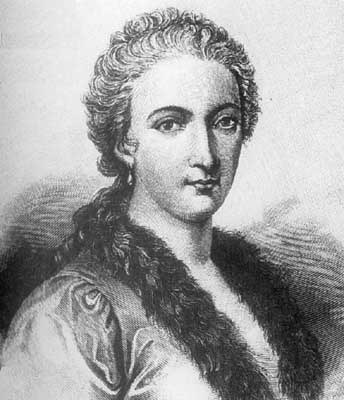
- Born: 16 May 1718; Milan, Duchy of Milan
- Died: 9 January 1799 (aged 80); Milan, Cisalpine Republic
- Known for: Author of Instituzioni Analitiche ad uso della gioventù italiana (English: Analytical Institutions for the use of Italian youth)
- Scientific career
- Fields: Mathematics
- Workplaces: University of Bologna

Maria Gaetana Agnesi (Note: Italian pronunciation: [maˈriːa ɡaeˈtaːna aɲˈɲeːzi, -ɲɛːz-]) (16 May 1718 – 9 January 1799) was a Milanese mathematician, philosopher, theologian, and humanitarian. She was the first woman to write a mathematics handbook, the first woman appointed as a mathematics professor at a university and the second woman appointed as a professor overall.

She is credited with writing the first book discussing both differential and integral calculus and was a member of the faculty at the University of Bologna, although she never served.

She devoted the last four decades of her life to studying theology (especially patristics) and to charitable work and serving the poor. She was a devout Catholic and wrote extensively on the marriage between intellectual pursuit and mystical contemplation, most notably in her essay Il cielo mistico (The Mystic Heaven). She saw the rational contemplation of God as a complement to prayer and contemplation of the life, death and resurrection of Jesus Christ.

Maria Teresa Agnesi Pinottini, harpsichordist and composer, was her sister.

== Early life ==
Maria Gaetana Agnesi was born in Milan, to a wealthy and literate family. Her father Pietro Agnesi, a wealthy silk merchant, wanted to elevate his family into the Milanese nobility. In order to achieve his goal, he married Anna Fortunato Brivio of the Brivius de Brokles family in 1717. Her mother's death provided her the excuse to retire from public life. She took over the management of the household. She was one of 21 children.

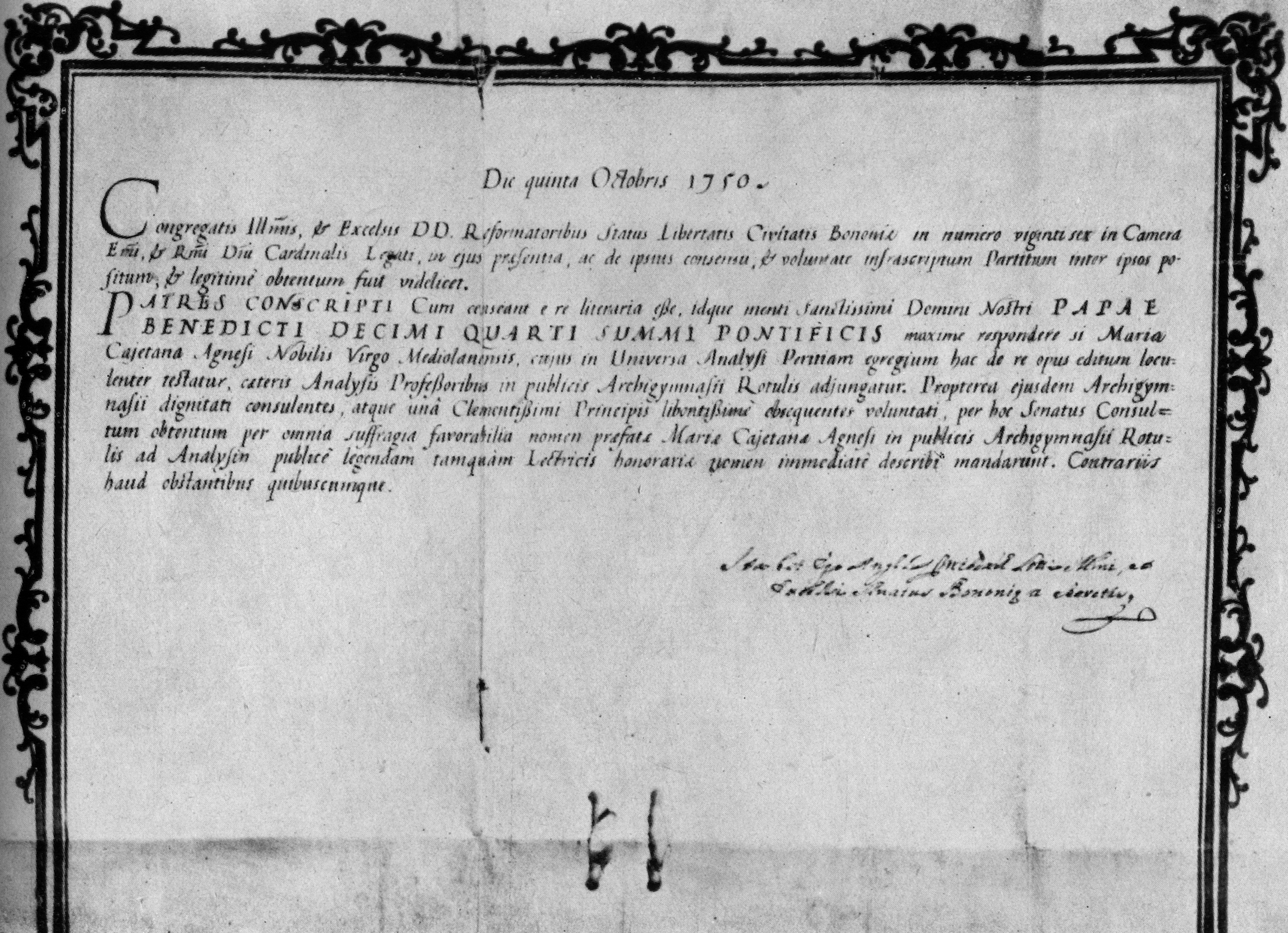
Agnesi's diploma from Università di Bologna

Maria was recognized early on as a child prodigy; she could speak both Italian and French at five years of age. At the age of nine, she composed and delivered a speech arguing for the education of women. By her eleventh birthday, she had also learned Greek, Hebrew, Spanish, German, and Latin, and was referred to as the "Seven-Tongued Orator".

Agnesi suffered a mysterious illness at the age of twelve that was attributed to her excessive studying and reading, so she was prescribed vigorous dancing and horseback riding. This treatment did not work; she began to experience extreme convulsions, after which she was encouraged to pursue moderation. By age fourteen, she was studying ballistics and geometry. When she was fifteen, her father began to regularly gather in his house a circle of the most learned men in Bologna, before whom she read and maintained a series of theses on the most abstruse philosophical questions. Records of these meetings are given in Charles de Brosses' Lettres sur l'Italie and in the Propositiones Philosophicae, which her father had published in 1738 as an account of her final performance, where she defended 190 philosophical theses.

Her father remarried twice after Maria's mother died, and Maria Agnesi ended up the eldest of 21 children, including her half-siblings. Her father agreed with her that if she were to continue her mathematics research, then she would be permitted to do all the charity work she wanted. In addition to her performances and lessons, her responsibility was to teach her siblings. This task kept her from her own goal of entering a convent, as she had become strongly religious. Although her father refused to grant this wish, he agreed to let her live from that time on in an almost conventual semi-retirement, avoiding all interactions with society and devoting herself entirely to the study of mathematics. After having read in 1739 the Traité analytique des sections coniques of the Marquis Guillaume de l'Hôpital, she was fully introduced into the field in 1740 by Ramiro Rampinelli, an Olivetan monk who was one of the most notable Italian mathematicians of that time. During that time, Maria studied with him both differential and integral calculus.

== Contributions to mathematics ==
=== Instituzioni analitiche ===
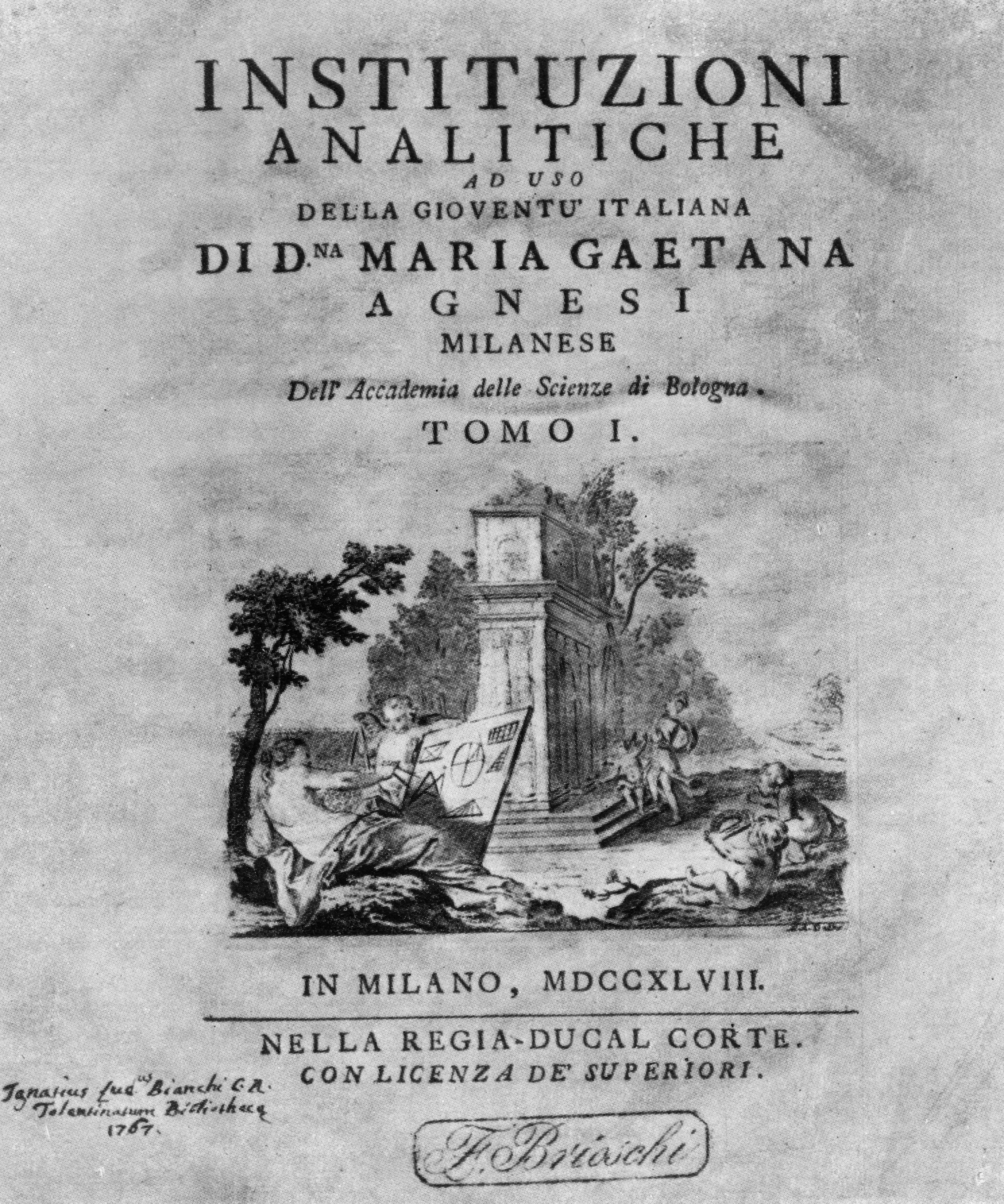
First page of Instituzioni analitiche (1748)

According to Britannica, she is "considered to be the first woman in the Western world to have achieved a reputation in mathematics". The most valuable result of her labours was the Instituzioni analitiche ad uso della gioventù italiana, (Analytical Institutions for the Use of Italian Youth) which was published in Milan in 1748 and "was regarded as the best introduction extant to the works of Euler". The goal of this work was, according to Agnesi herself, to give a systematic illustration of the different results and theorems of infinitesimal calculus. The model for her treatise was Le calcul différentiel et intégral dans l’Analyse by Charles René Reyneau. In this treatise, she worked on integrating mathematical analysis with algebra. The first volume treats the analysis of finite quantities and the second of the analysis of infinitesimals.

A French translation of the second volume by P. T. d'Antelmy, with additions by Charles Bossut (1730–1814), was published in Paris in 1775; and Analytical Institutions, an English translation of the whole work by John Colson (1680–1760), the Lucasian Professor of Mathematics at Cambridge, "inspected" by John Hellins, was published in 1801 at the expense of Baron Maseres. The work was dedicated to Empress Maria Theresa, who thanked Agnesi with the gift of a diamond ring, a personal letter, and a diamond and crystal case. Many others praised her work, including Pope Benedict XIV, who wrote her a complimentary letter and sent her a gold wreath and a gold medal.

In writing this work, Agnesi was advised and helped by two distinguished mathematicians: her former teacher Ramiro Rampinelli and Jacopo Riccati.

==== Witch of Agnesi ====
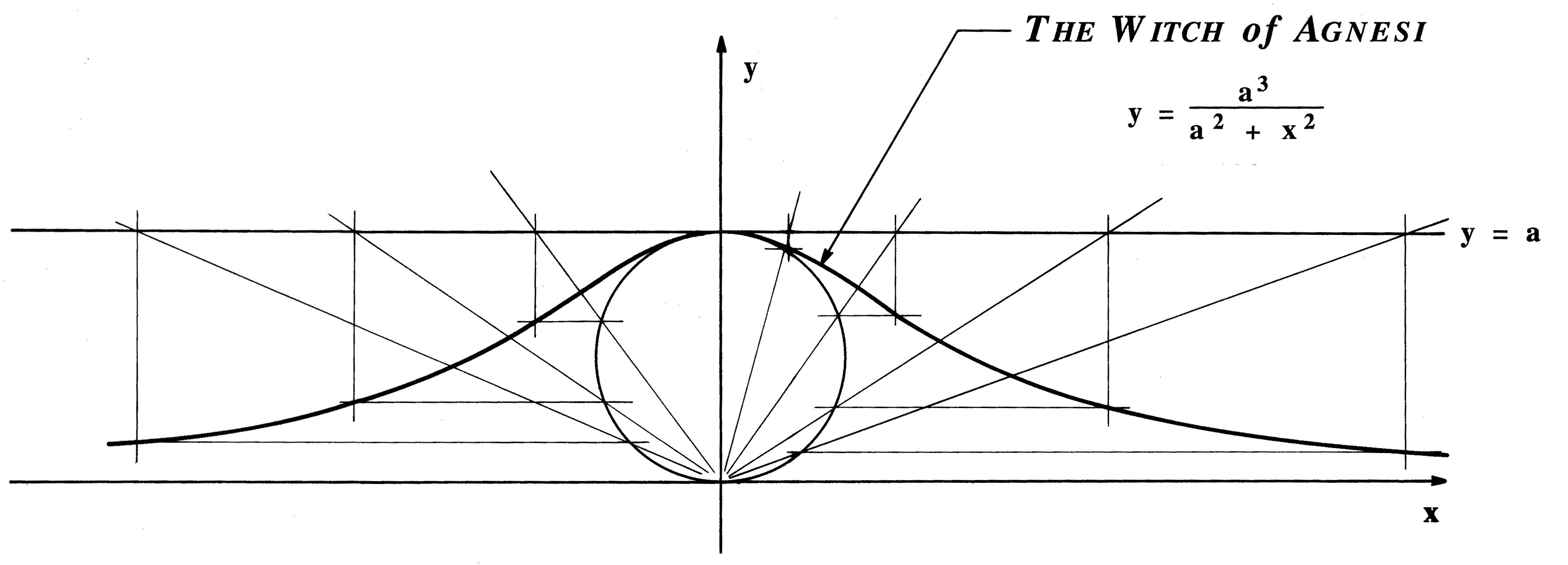
Graphical construction of the Witch of Agnesi

In Instituzioni analitiche, Agnesi discussed a curve earlier studied and constructed by Pierre de Fermat and Guido Grandi.

Agnesi described the curve as versiera in Italian, which is a synonym for the adjective versoria meaning "turning in every direction". At the same time versiera was used as a term for a "she-devil" or "witch", from Latin Adversarius, an alias for "devil" (Adversary of God). Future translations and publications of the Instituzioni analitiche carried forward the former meaning either as a translation error or possibly as a pun. The curve has become known as the "Witch of Agnesi".

=== Other ===
Agnesi also wrote a commentary on the Traité analytique des sections coniques du marquis de l'Hôpital which, though highly praised by those who saw it in manuscript, was never published.

== Later life ==
In 1750, on the illness of her father, she was appointed by Pope Benedict XIV to the chair of mathematics and natural philosophy and physics at Bologna, though she never served. She was the second woman ever to be granted a professorship at a university, Laura Bassi being the first. In 1751, she became ill again and was told not to study by her doctors. After the death of her father in 1752 she carried out a long-cherished purpose by giving herself to the study of theology, and especially of the Fathers and devoted herself to the poor, homeless, and sick, giving away the gifts she had received and begging for money to continue her work with the poor. Finally, thanks to a donation from Prince Antonio Tolomeo Trivulzio, the Pio Albergo Trivulzio was established in Milan in 1771, and Cardinal Giuseppe Pozzobonelli invited Agnesi to serve as the "visitor and director of women, especially the sick." On 9 January 1799, Maria Agnesi died poor and was buried in a mass grave for the poor with fifteen other bodies.

== Recognition ==
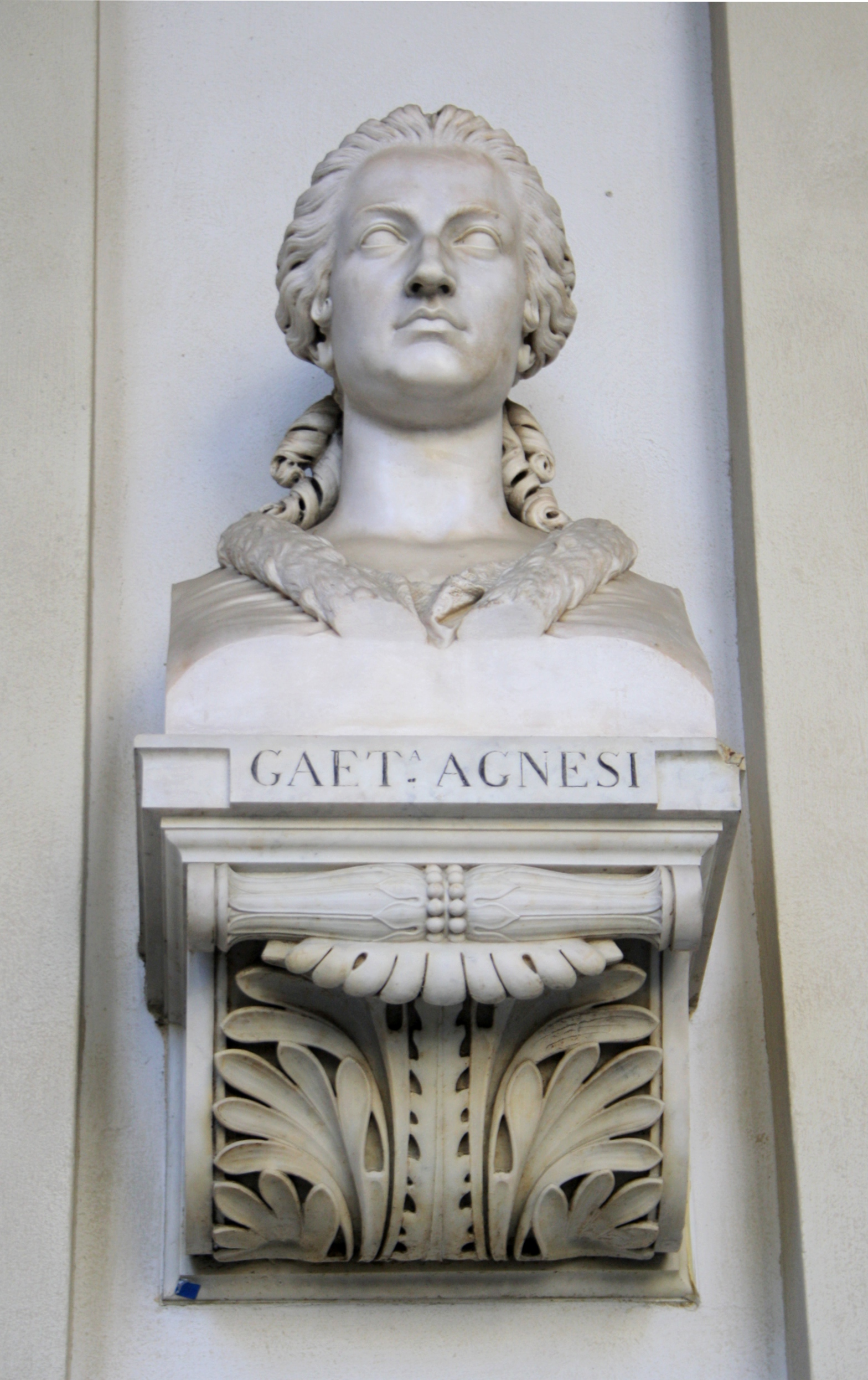
Bust of Maria Gaetana Agnesi in Milan

In 1996, an asteroid, 16765 Agnesi, was named after Agnesi.

There is a crater on Venus named Agnesi after her.

She is included in a deck of playing cards featuring notable women mathematicians published by the Association of Women in Mathematics.

Poet Jessy Randall's 2022 collection Mathematics for Ladies includes a poem honoring Agnesi.

== See also ==
- Elena Cornaro Piscopia
- Cristina Roccati
