= Tisiphone =

Ancient Greek punisher of murder

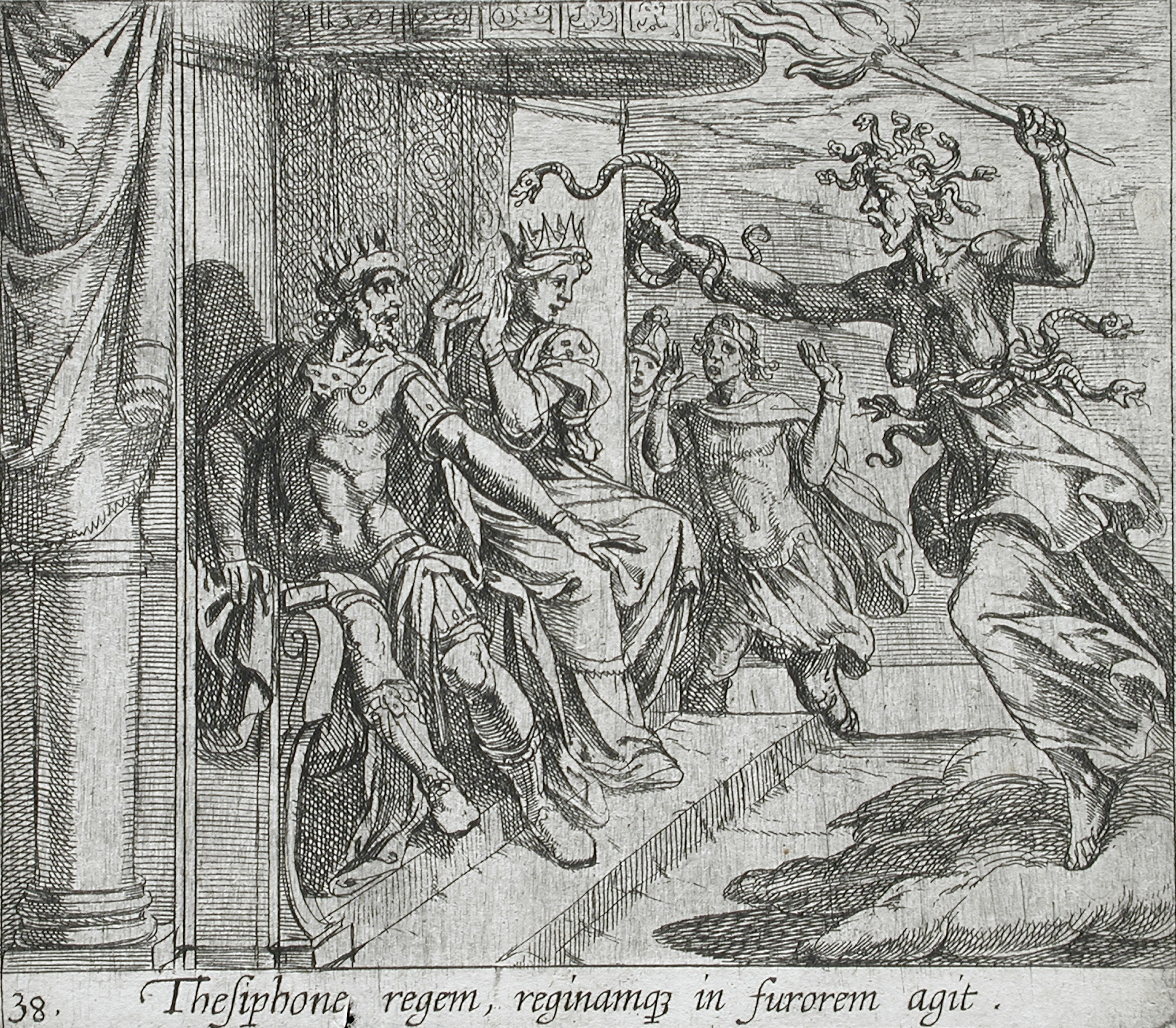
Antonio Tempesta, The Fury Tisiphone at the Palace of Athamas

Tisiphone (Ancient Greek: Τισιφόνη, romanized: Tisiphónē, "Avenger of murder"), or Tilphousia, is one of the three Erinyes or Furies in classical mythology. Her sisters are Alecto and Megaera. They reside in the underworld and ascend to earth in pursuit of the wicked. She and her sisters punish crimes of murder: parricide, fratricide and homicide.

== In culture ==
=== Literature ===
- In book I poem 3 of Tibullus's elegies, Tisiphone, unkempt with fierce snakes instead of hair, chases impious souls here and there in Tartarus.
- In Book VI of Virgil's Aeneid, she is described as the guardian of the gates of Tartarus, "clothed in a blood-wet dress".
- In Book X of the Aeneid, she is described as "pale" and raging "among the warring thousands" during the battle between Mezentius and Aeneas's men.
- In Book IV of Ovid's Metamorphoses, she is described as a denizen of Dis who wears a dripping red robe and who has a serpent coiled around her waist. At the behest of Juno, Tisiphone drives Athamas and Ino mad with the breath of a serpent extracted from her hair and a poison made from froth from the mouth of Cerberus and Echidna's venom.
- Tisiphone has a prominent role in Statius' Thebaid, where she spurs on the war between Polynices and Eteocles at the behest of their father, Oedipus. One of her more gruesome feats in the epic is to drive the hero, Tydeus, to cannibalism. In a bizarrely pastoral scene, Tisiphone first appears in the epic lounging beside the Cocytus river in the underworld, letting her serpent locks lap at the sulfuric waters.
- According to one myth, she fell in love with a mortal, Cithaeron, but was spurned; in her anger she formed a poisonous snake from her hair, which bit and killed him.
- In Book I of Chaucer's Troilus and Criseyde, the narrator calls upon her to help him to write the tragedy properly.
- In Canto IX of Dante's Inferno, she appears with her sisters before the gates of Dis, threatening to unveil the Medusa.

=== Ships ===
- HMS Tisiphone was a fire ship of the Royal Navy launched in 1781 and sold for breaking up in 1816.

=== Astronomy ===
- Minor planet 466 Tisiphone is named after her.

== See also ==
- Family tree of the Greek gods
