= John Colson =

English clergyman and mathematician (1680–1760)

The Reverend John Colson FRS
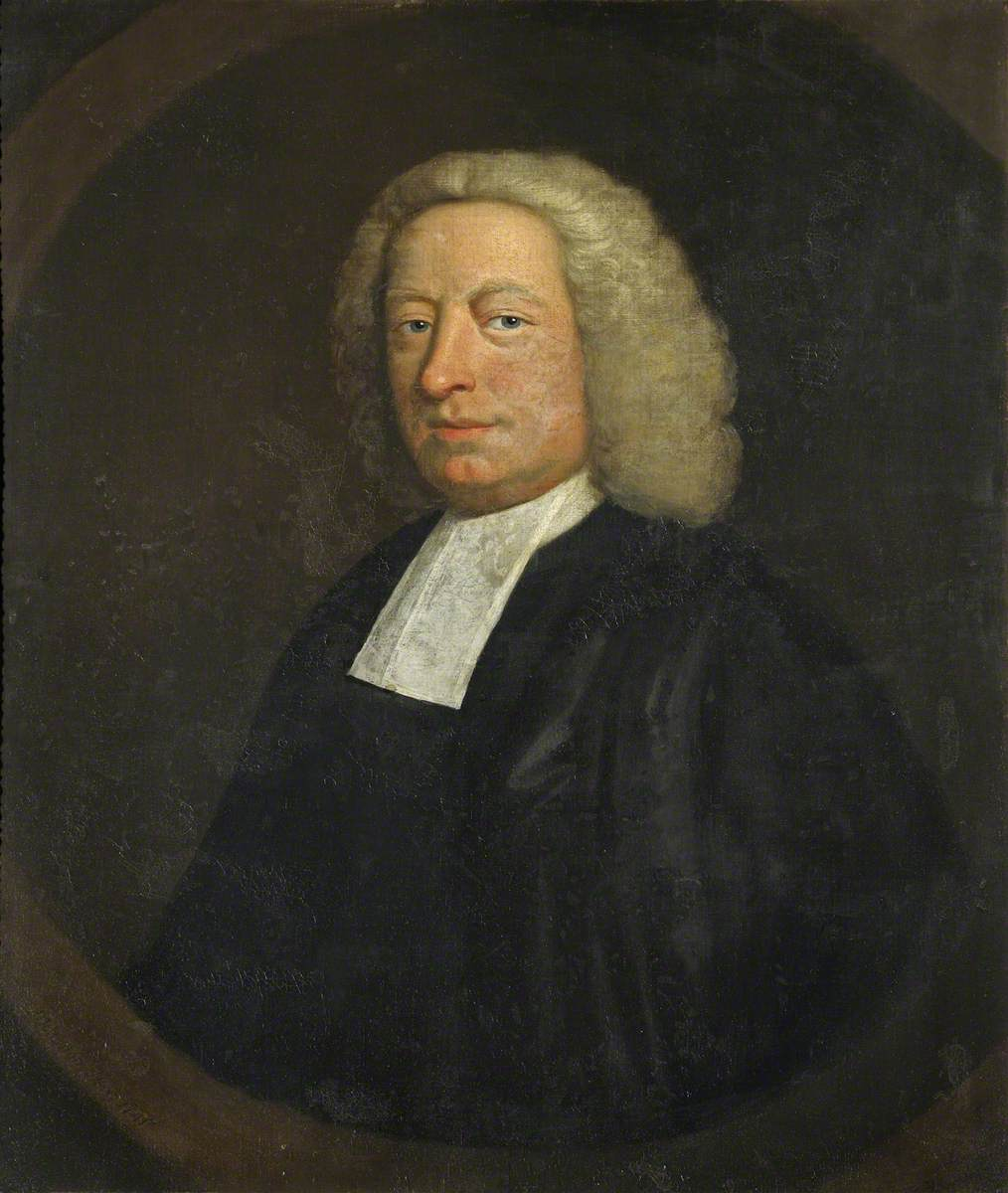
- John Colson by John Wollaston
- Born: 1680
- Died: 20 January 1760 (aged 79–80); Cambridge
- Education: Christ Church, Oxford
- Known for: Signed-digit representation
- Scientific career
- Fields: Mathematics
- Workplaces: University of Cambridge

John Colson FRS (1680 – 20 January 1760) was an English clergyman, mathematician, and the Lucasian Professor of Mathematics at Cambridge University.

== Life ==
John Colson was educated at Lichfield School before becoming an undergraduate at Christ Church, Oxford, though he did not complete a degree there. He became a schoolmaster at Sir Joseph Williamson's Mathematical School in Rochester, and was elected a Fellow of the Royal Society in 1713. He was Vicar of Chalk, Kent from 1724 to 1740. He relocated to Cambridge and lectured at Sidney Sussex College, Cambridge. From 1739 to 1760, he was Lucasian Professor of Mathematics. He was also Rector of Lockington, Yorkshire.

== Works ==
In 1726 he published his "Negativo-Affirmativo Arithmetik", which advocated a modified decimal system of numeration. He proposed "reduction [to] small figures" by "throwing all the large figures $9, 8, 7, 6$ out of a given number, and introducing in their room the equivalent small figures $1\bar{1}, 1\bar{2}, 1\bar{3}, 1\bar{4}$ respectively". This method of signifying numbers is now called signed-digit representation.

John Colson translated several of Isaac Newton's works into English, including De Methodis Serierum et Fluxionum in 1736.

== See also ==
- Method of Fluxions
- Witch of Agnesi
