= Agnesi (company) =

Italian food company

- Type: Private
- Industry: Food
- Founded: 1824; 202 years ago
- Founder: Paolo Battista Agnesi
- Headquarters: Fossano, Italy
- Products: Pasta, flour, tomato sauce
- Owner: Colussi
- Website: www.agnesi.it

Agnesi is an Italian food company based in Fossano founded in 1824.

== History ==
Agnesi is the oldest pasta producer brand in history. It all began in 1824 with the purchase of a mill in Pontedassio by Paolo Battista Agnesi (1790–1863), which allowed him to grind 40 quintals of grains a day and directly produce pasta.

The introduction of new milling methods, learned in France by his son Giuseppe, made it possible to increase production and pushed the family to equip its own fleet of sailing ships to supply taganrog from Ukraine (which was then considered the best durum wheat in the world). For this reason the sailing ship will remain in the symbol of the company. Another large mill was also opened near the port of Oneglia to ensure a faster and more constant supply of raw materials; thus the Paolo Agnesi e Figli company was born.
