= 477 Italia =

Main-belt asteroid

Discovery
- Discovered by: Luigi Carnera
- Discovery site: Heidelberg
- Discovery date: 23 August 1901

Designations
- Pronunciation: /ɪˈtæliə/
- Named after: Italy
- Alternative designations: 1901 GR; A905 UK

Orbital characteristics
- Epoch 31 July 2016 (JD 2457600.5)
- Uncertainty parameter 0
- Observation arc: 114.61 yr (41862 d)
- Aphelion: 2.8698979 AU (429.33061 Gm)
- Perihelion: 1.9640980 AU (293.82488 Gm)
- Semi-major axis: 2.416998 AU (361.5778 Gm)
- Eccentricity: 0.1873812
- Orbital period (sidereal): 3.76 yr (1372.5 d)
- Mean anomaly: 224.20862°
- Mean motion: 0° 15^{m} 44.261^{s} / day
- Inclination: 5.288912°
- Longitude of ascending node: 10.68098°
- Argument of perihelion: 322.42220°

Physical characteristics
- Dimensions: 22.51±1.1 km
- Synodic rotation period: 19.413 h (0.8089 d)
- Geometric albedo: 0.2769±0.028
- Spectral type: T/B
- Absolute magnitude (H): 10.25

477 Italia (1901 GR) is a main-belt asteroid that was discovered on 23 August 1901 by Italian astronomer Luigi Carnera at Heidelberg.

Photometric observations of this asteroid collected in 2005 gave a provisional rotation period of 19.4189 hours and a brightness variation of about 0.2 in magnitude.
