= Agnesi (crater) =

Crater on Venus

- Feature type: Impact crater
- Location: Venus
- Coordinates: 39.4°S 37.7°E
- Diameter: 42.4 km
- Eponym: Maria Agnesi, Italian mathematician

Agnesi is a crater on the planet Venus. It was named after Maria Gaetana Agnesi, an Italian mathematician; Venusian craters are named after notable women. The crater was named by the International Astronomical Union's Working Group on Planetary System Nomenclature in 1991. It is located at 39.4 degrees south and 37.7 degrees east. The crater is 42.4 kilometers in diameter.
