= 16765 Agnesi =

Main-belt asteroid

Discovery
- Discovered by: P. G. Comba
- Discovery site: Prescott Obs.
- Discovery date: 16 October 1996

Designations
- Named after: Maria Agnesi (Italian mathematician)
- Alternative designations: 1996 UA
- Minor planet category: main-belt · Eunomia

Orbital characteristics
- Epoch 4 September 2017 (JD 2458000.5)
- Uncertainty parameter 0
- Observation arc: 19.88 yr (7,261 days)
- Aphelion: 2.9139 AU
- Perihelion: 2.3361 AU
- Semi-major axis: 2.6250 AU
- Eccentricity: 0.1101
- Orbital period (sidereal): 4.25 yr (1,553 days)
- Mean anomaly: 4.2373°
- Mean motion: 0° 13^{m} 54.12^{s} / day
- Inclination: 12.266°
- Longitude of ascending node: 17.764°
- Argument of perihelion: 314.93°

Physical characteristics
- Dimensions: 3.84 km (calculated); 4.132±0.247 km
- Synodic rotation period: 7.5458±0.0034 h
- Geometric albedo: 0.21 (assumed); 0.2849±0.0250; 0.285±0.025
- Spectral type: S
- Absolute magnitude (H): 13.9 · 13.30±0.00 · 13.943±0.004 (R) · 14.39

16765 Agnesi (provisional designation 1996 UA) is a stony Eunomia asteroid from the middle region of the asteroid belt, approximately 4 kilometers in diameter. It was discovered on 16 October 1996, by Italian-American amateur astronomer Paul Comba at his private Prescott Observatory in Arizona, United States. The asteroid was named after Italian mathematician Maria Gaetana Agnesi.

== Orbit and classification ==
Agnesi is a member of the Eunomia family, a large group of S-type asteroids and the most prominent family in the central main-belt. It orbits the Sun at a distance of 2.3–2.9 AU once every 4 years and 3 months (1,553 days). Its orbit has an eccentricity of 0.11 and an inclination of 12° with respect to the ecliptic. It was first observed by Haleakala–NEAT/GEODSS (566), extending the asteroid's observation arc by 32 days prior to its official discovery observation.

== Physical characteristics ==
=== Diameter and albedo ===
According to the NEOWISE mission of NASA's space-based Wide-field Infrared Survey Explorer, Agnesi measures 4.1 kilometers in diameter and its surface has an albedo of 0.28, while the Collaborative Asteroid Lightcurve Link assumes an albedo of 0.21 – derived from 15 Eunomia, the family's largest member and namesake – and calculates a diameter of 3.8 kilometers.

=== Lightcurves ===
A rotational lightcurve of Agnesi was obtained from photometric observations taken by astronomers at the Palomar Transient Factory in September 2013. Lightcurve analysis gave a rotation period of 7.5458 hours with a brightness variation of 0.31 magnitude (U=2).

== Naming ==
This minor planet was named in honor of Italian Maria Gaetana Agnesi (1718–1799), who was the first Western woman to write a widely translated mathematics handbook and the first woman appointed to a professorship at a university in 1750. The official naming citation was published by the Minor Planet Center on 9 January 2001 (M.P.C. 41941).
