= Astronomical Observatory of Trieste =

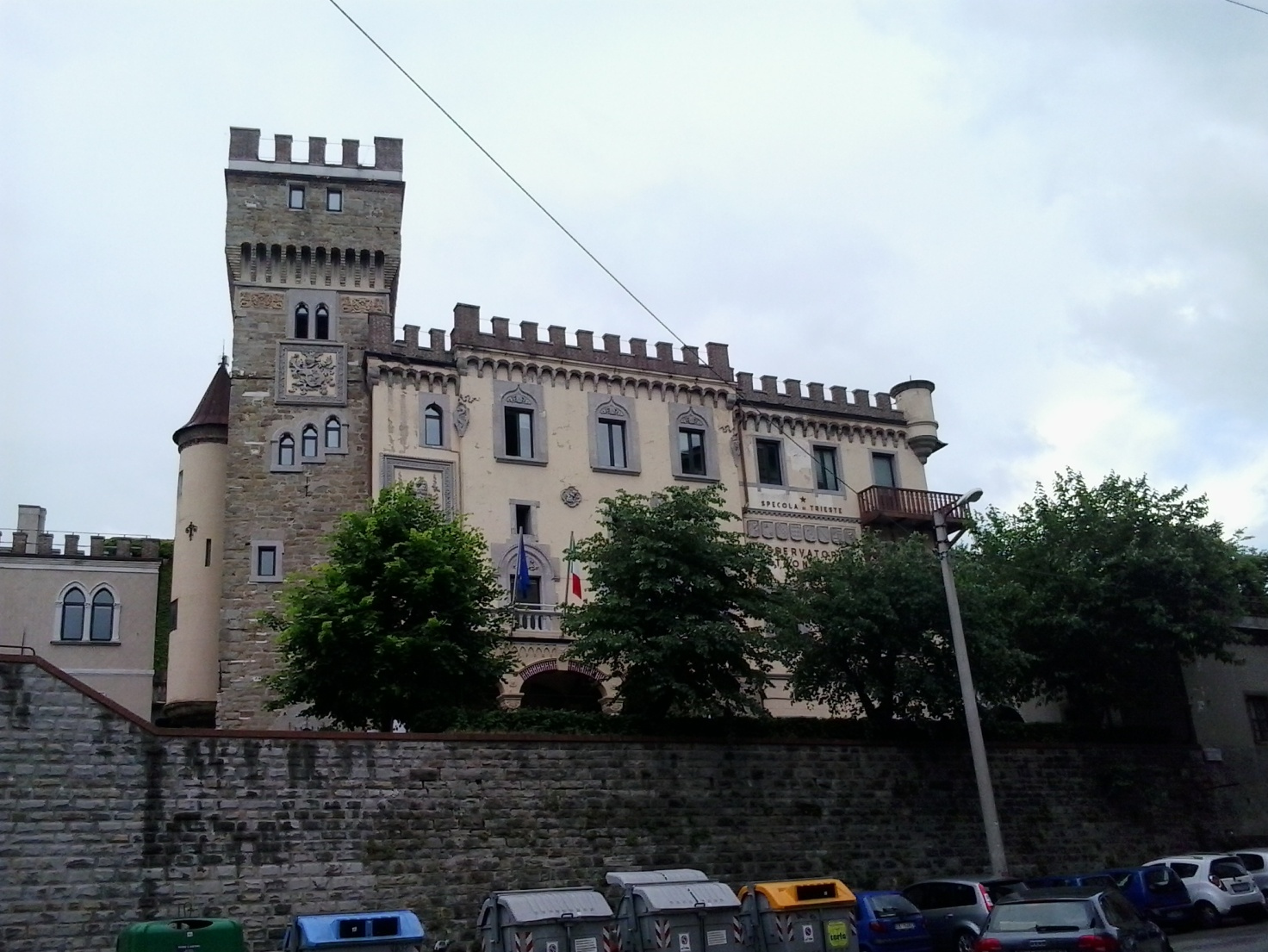
- Alternative names: Trieste Observatory
- Observatory code: 038, A82
- Location: Trieste, regional decentralization entity of Trieste, Friuli-Venezia Giulia, Italy
- Coordinates: 45°38′41″N 13°46′26″E
- Website: www.oats.inaf.it
- Related media on Commons

Astronomical Observatory of Trieste (Italian: Osservatorio Astronomico di Trieste or OAT) is an astronomical center of studies located in the city of Trieste in northern Italy.

== Origins ==
The observatory traces its origins from the Nautical School founded in Trieste by the Empress Maria Theresa of Austria in 1753. Following the dissolution of Austria-Hungary after World War I and the annexation of Trieste by the Kingdom of Italy, the observatory joined the list of Italian astronomical observatories in 1923. Today the observatory is part of Italy's National Institute for Astrophysics (Istituto Nazionale di Astrofisica or INAF), which includes 20 research institutions around the country. The scientific production of the Astronomical Observatory of Trieste exceeds 130 papers per year, mostly published in international peer-reviewed journals.

== Research ==
The main research activities done at the observatory concern extragalactic astronomy and cosmology (large-scale structure of the universe, intergalactic media), stellar physics, interstellar medium and the galaxy, the physics of the Sun and the Solar System (radioastronomy, coronal plasma, cometary and interplanetary dust), high energy astrophysics (supernovae, gamma-ray bursts), astronomical technologies (computer systems for data acquisition and control, including remote control, acquisition, handling and analysis of images, supercomputing) and space astronomy (development of space technologies and space observations). Of special importance is the participation in the projects of the European Southern Observatory (ESO): the Very Large Telescope (VLT) operated by ESO in Chile; the Large Binocular Telescope (LBT) in Arizona, the Planck spacecraft operated by the European Space Agency (ESA) from 2009 to 2013; and the European Extremely Large Telescope (E-ELT).

The Astronomical Observatory of Trieste is integrated with all the major local scientific institutions in and around Trieste (the AREA Science Park, the International School for Advanced Studies and the University of Trieste) and cooperates with major national and international astronomical institutions, such as the Italian Space Agency (ASI) and the European Space Agency (ESA).

== See also ==
- List of astronomical observatories
