= Mario Rigutti =

Italian astronomer (1926–2026)

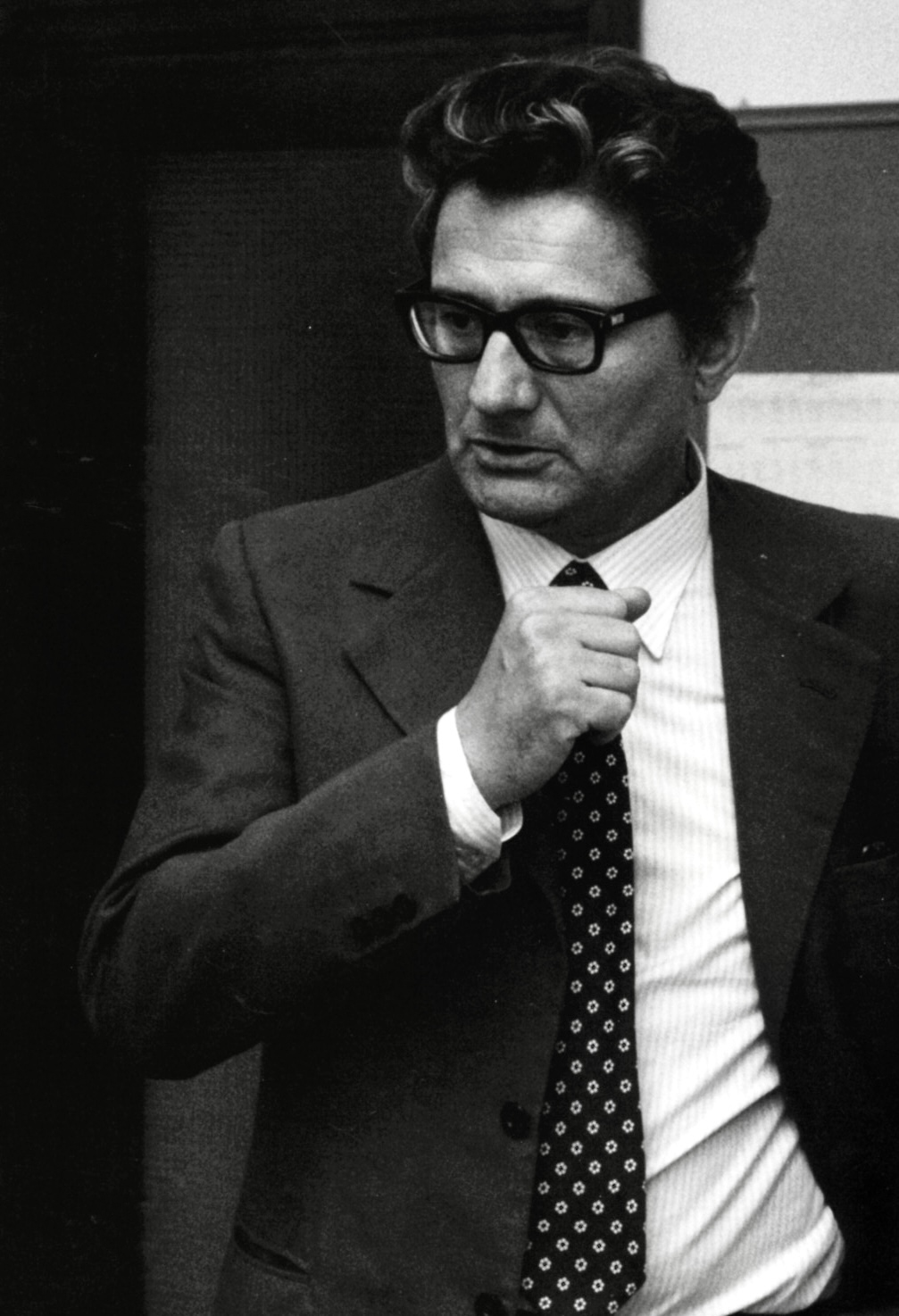
- Born: 19 August 1926; Trieste, Italy
- Died: 12 January 2026 (aged 99); Florence, Italy
- Occupations: Astronomer, science communicator
- Employer(s): University of Florence; University of Naples Federico II; Astronomical Observatory of Capodimonte

Mario Rigutti (19 August 1926 – 12 January 2026) was an Italian astronomer and science communicator. He served as the director of the Capodimonte Astronomical Observatory from 1969 to 1992 and was president of the Italian Astronomical Society.

== Early life ==
Born in the working-class neighborhood of San Giacomo in Trieste to Giorgio Rigutti and Rosalia Coceani, Mario Rigutti spent part of his childhood there with his sisters Vittoria and Bruna. His father, a keen reader and freethinker, encouraged him to study nature, especially astronomy. However, his adolescence was not an easy one: the Second World War also engulfed Italy when he was fourteen. A naval engineer by training at the Nautical Institute, he was imprisoned twice: by the fascist police in 1944 and, after the war, by the Yugoslav occupation troops in 1945. On this occasion, he lost some dear friends who ended up in a Karst foiba, but he emerged unscathed, returning to live with his parents in one of the rooms in homes requisitioned by the municipality to house those left homeless by Allied bombings.

After attending a naval radio operator course, in 1946 he took the high school diploma exam at the Liceo scientifico to enter university. Wanting to become an astronomer, he followed the advice of Giovanni Battista Lacchini, whom he had met at the Trieste Astronomical Observatory then directed by Ettore Leonida Martin, and enrolled in the degree program in mathematics and physics. He spent his final year of studies in Florence, where he attended the Arcetri Observatory and graduated with Giorgio Abetti as his supervisor and Guglielmo Righini as his co-supervisor. His thesis, which took into account the most advanced experimental results on the solar spectrum obtained from the first observations conducted with V-2 rockets outside the Earth's atmosphere, was later published under the title "Mean Optical Depth and Temperature of the Solar Photosphere."

Once graduated, with no job or scholarship available, he had to return to Trieste, where he took up a position teaching mathematics at a middle school. After a few months, Giorgio Abetti offered him the opportunity to return to Florence as an assistant professor of astronomy, replacing Margherita Hack, who had moved to Milan.

== Academic career ==
In 1954, having won the relevant exam, he became a full member of the group of astronomers working at Arcetri. The following year, he married Carla Rossi, a literature student, and within a couple of years, Adriana, a future biologist and science communicator, and Enrico, a future surgeon, were born.

In 1960, he won a fellowship from the Canadian National Research Council (CNR), which took him and his family to Canada, where he stayed at the Dominion Observatory in Ottawa. There, he worked on the cyanogen molecule, a research that brought him into contact with future Nobel Prize winner Gerhard Herzberg and his wife Luise, as well as, among others, Jack Locke, head of the stellar division, and Vic Gaizauskas, an astronomer at the observatory.

In 1961, Mario Rigutti obtained a libera docenza in astrophysics and, thanks to a travel grant from the Organization for European Economic Cooperation (OEEC), spent a period in California, at the Astronomical Department of the University of Berkeley directed by John G. Phillips. At Berkeley, among other things, he had the opportunity to work with technologically advanced equipment for the photometric analysis of spectra and other data on photographic plates. Returning to Florence, he taught, by appointment, astrophysics for the Faculty of Science (1961–1969) and physics for the Faculty of architecture (1962–1964). During this period he observed four total solar eclipses: the first at Arcetri (1961), the other three while leading expeditions in Canada (1963), in Greece (1966) and in Brazil (1966).

In 1969, he was appointed to the chair of astronomy at the Faculty of Science at the University of Naples Federico II and assumed the direction of the Capodimonte Astronomical Observatory (Naples)—which had been on the brink of survival for decades—and that of Collurania in Teramo. In Naples, in addition to introducing the Astrophysics curriculum into the university's physics degree program, he devoted his energies to the reconstruction and scientific modernization of the Capodimonte Astronomical Observatory, where, in collaboration with the Astronomical Observatory of Trieste, he also imported the instruments used at Berkeley. In 1973, he organized an expedition to Mauritania to observe a total solar eclipse.

In subsequent years, he built, among other things, an educational planetarium in Naples, a large underground hall for conferences and events, and, in 1991, the Astronomical Museum of the Capodimonte Observatory. That same year, collaborating with Angelo Racaniello and Francesco Cianci, mayors of Castelgrande (Potenza), he founded the Toppo Astronomical Station in Castelgrande.

From 1997, he was retired and lived in Florence with his family. Here, in addition to writing several popular science books, he devoted himself to fiction and poetry.

== Scientific and outreach activities ==
=== Research activities ===
Author of over 150 scientific publications and university lecture notes, Rigutti studied the Sun's outer layers (photosphere, chromosphere, corona), solar activity phenomena (flares, prominences), spectroscopic analysis of molecular bands with subsequent identification of lines in the Sun's spectrum, element abundances in the photosphere, and instrument design for both solar observation and laboratory analysis of experimental data.

=== Teaching and outreach ===
Rigutti was interested in issues related to science education and popular science, which he considered essential to the development of an advanced country. For this particular activity, in addition to courses in Physics, Astrophysics, and History of Astronomy at the University of Florence, and Astronomy and Astrophysics at the University of Naples, he organized and directed numerous national and international conferences, symposia, workshops, and schools, including on behalf of the International Astronomical Union. He gave numerous lectures in cultural circles and schools, published and edited textbooks, and wrote a dozen popular science books and more than 300 articles and reviews in newspapers and magazines.

== Death ==
Rigutti died on 12 January 2026, at the age of 99.

== Positions held ==
During his career, Mario Rigutti was:

- Member since 1950 and then president of the Italian Astronomical Society from 1977 to 1981
- Member of the International Astronomical Union (1954–1974)
- Member of the European Solar Research Organization, Sun group (1968–1972)
- Member of the Italian Physical Society (since 1968)
- Director of the Capodimonte Astronomical Observatory, Naples (1969–1992) and of the Collurania Astronomical Observatory (1969–1987), now the Abruzzo Astronomical Observatory
- Co-founder and director of the Journal of Astronomy of the Italian Astronomical Society (1975–1981)
- Member of the Council for Astronomical Research of the Ministry of Education (1983–1987)
- National member of the Accademia Pontaniana in Naples (1981) and of the National Society of Sciences, Letters and Arts of Naples (1982) of which he was also president (1991)
- Member of the board of directors of the Catania Astrophysical Observatory (1985–1986)
- Member of the Scientific Council of the journal Albero a elica (1986–1988) and of the journal Sapere (Dedalo, 1972–2014)

== Works ==
=== Publications in the field of teaching ===
- Notes on Astronomy, Editrice Universitaria, Florence, 1959
- Introduction to Solar Physics, Editrice Universitaria, Florence, 1966
- "Natural Sciences," in collaboration with P. Battaglini, M. Boccaletti, G. Ficcarelli, E. Totaro Aloj, LeMonnier, 1981
- "Experimenting and Reflecting," Science Course for Middle School in 3 Volumes and Teacher's Guide, in collaboration with B. Bertolini, A. Finocchiaro, O. Pasquali, and Maria Antonia Santaniello, Società Editrice Internazionale (S.E.I.), Turin, 1991
- "Teaching Problems Related to Mathematical and Experimental Sciences in Middle School and Upper Secondary School: A Comparative Survey of the Situation in Some European Countries," in collaboration with A. Bargellini, F. Emiliani Zauli, P. Gherardini, G. Pirillo, C. Pucci, V. Villani, COASSI, 1979
- "Science Teaching in Secondary School in Europe": A Comparative Analysis, in collaboration with: A. Bargellini, F. Emiliani Zauli, P. Gherardini, G. Pirillo, C. Pucci, V. Villani, Ministry of Education and Institute of the Italian Encyclopedia, 1981
- "Comets in Modern Astronomy," edited by Mariano Bianca and Maria Antonia Santaniello, "Proceedings of the COASSI Conference," University of Naples, Guida, 1983
- "Scientific Popularization and Science Teaching," edited in collaboration with Mariano Bianca and Maria Antonia Santaniello, "Proceedings of the COASSI Conference," Province of Florence Department of Education, Documentation Center Notebook, 1986

=== Popular science books ===
- The Sun and the Earth, Laterza, Bari, 1960
- One Hundred Billion Stars, Giunti Martello, Florence, 1978; reprinted 1979, 1984; 2nd edition 1995 (ebook, paperback)
- Life in the Universe, Rizzoli, Milan, 1981
- Comets, Rizzoli, Milan, 1984
- A Hundred Billion Stars, The MIT Press, Cambridge, Mass., 1984
- The Solar System, edited by Corso ed., Ferrara, 1984
- Urania's Hill; The Historical Museum of the Capodimonte Astronomical Observatory, (ed.), Elio de Rosa ed., Naples, 1992
- The Capodimonte Astronomical Observatory, (ed.), Fausto Fiorentino ed., Naples, 1992
- Astronomy, edited by Giunti Marzocco, Florence, 1986, new edition 2001
- The Shadow of the Sun, Giunti, Florence, 1996
- Comets, Meteorites, and Shooting Stars, Giunti, Florence, 1997 (ebook, paperback)
- Atlas of the Sky, Giunti, Florence, 1997
- History of Western Astronomy, Giunti, Florence, 1999 (ebook, paperback)
- Sky, Stars, and Planets: Discovering the Universe, Giunti, Florence, 2006
- Galileo Galilei, Giunti, Florence, 2009
- The Disappearance of the Sun, Giannini, Naples, 2014
- As if... Shadows of the Universe, Amazon, 2015 (ebook, paperback)

=== Fiction and poetry ===
- Ragazzi senza bandiera (novel), Ibiskos, Empoli, 2006
- Up and Down These Stairs, poems in the Triestine language, Hammerle, Trieste, 2007
- Zùchero e sal, poems in the Triestine language, Hammerle, Trieste, 2009
- Dopo la piova, poems in the Triestine language, Baraka, Florence, 2011
- Poesie della sera, Amazon, Charleston, South Carolina, 2015 (paperback, ebook)
- Poesie della notte, Amazon (Great Britain), 2016 (paperback)
- Un amore sbagliato, Fulfillment (Poland Sp. Z.o.o. Wroclaw), 2017 (paperback)
- Bolle di sapone, Distribution Gmbh, Leipzig, Germany, 2017 (paperback)
- The Long Night, Amazon Fulfillment (Poland Sp. Z.o.o. Wroclaw), 2017 (paperback)
- Professor Cosimo Sturm, Amazon Fulfillment (Poland Sp. Z.o.o. Wroclaw), 2020 (paperback)

== Awards ==
- In 2019, the asteroid 33823 Mariorigutti was named after him.

== Bibliography ==
- AA. VV., The Hill of Urania. The Historical Museum of the Capodimonte Astronomical Observatory, Elio de Rosa, Naples, 1992
- AA. VV., The Capodimonte Astronomical Observatory, Fausto Fiorentino, Naples, 1992
- Capaccioli M., Longo G., Olostro Cirella E.: Astronomy in Naples from the Eighteenth Century to the Present Day, Guida, Naples, 2009
- Chiereghin W. and Martelli C.: Dictionary of Authors from Trieste, the Isonzo, Istria, and Dalmatia, Hammerle, Trieste, 2014
- Della Valle M., Olostro Cirella E., Gargano M.: Capodimonte, Two Centuries of Light, Le Stelle, Gruppo B ed., Milan, March 2013
- Gualandi A.: Astronomy in Naples from the Eighteenth Century to the Present Day, Giornale di Astronoma, March 2010
- Witt V.: The Stars Above Naples, Le Scienze Astronomy, Milan, October 2011
