= Abetti =

Abetti may refer to:

- Antonio Abetti (1846–1928), Italian astronomer
- Giorgio Abetti (1882–1982), Italian solar astronomer, son of Antonio
- Abetti (crater), a lunar crater named after the two astronomers
