= Attilio Colacevich =

Italian astronomer

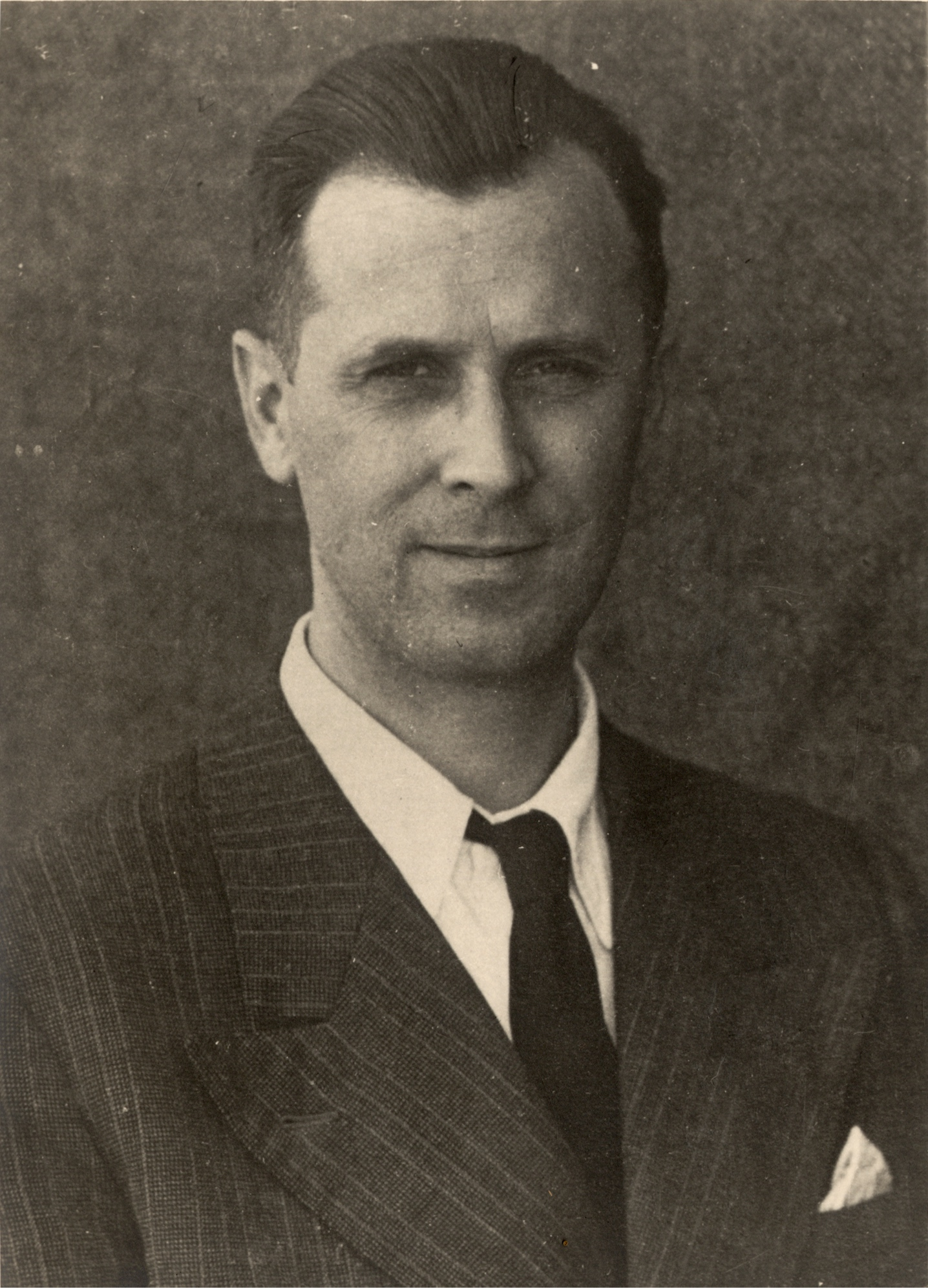
- Attilio Colacevich
- Born: 25 July 1906; Fiume, Austria-Hungary
- Died: 24 August 1953 (aged 47); Naples, Italy
- Education: University of Florence
- Scientific career
- Fields: astronomy, mathematics
- Workplaces: University of Florence; Arcetri Astrophysical Observatory; Astronomical Observatory of Capodimonte; University of Naples Federico II; Naval University Institute

Attilio Colacevich (Italian pronunciation: [atˈtiːljo koˈlaːtʃevitʃ]; 25 July 1906 – 24 August 1953) was an Italian astronomer.

== Biography ==
Colacevich was born in Fiume. He graduated in physics from the University of Florence in 1929, and in 1933 Giorgio Abetti hired him as assistant to the Arcetri Observatory. In 1934 he obtained a fellowship from the Rockefeller Foundation at the Lick Observatory carrying out research on spectroscopic binaries. In June 1948 he was appointed director of the Collurania astronomical observatory in Teramo and, a few months later, director of the Astronomical Observatory of Capodimonte in Naples. In 1949 he returned to America, first at the Warner and Swasey Observatory in Cleveland making observations with Jason Nassau with the Burrell-Schmidt telescope for studies on the spectroscopic classification of red stars, then he moved to Chicago at the Yerkes Observatory, and finally stayed for a month in Texas at the McDonald Observatory. Here he collaborated with Otto Struve who called him one of the most active European astronomers. Together with Gerard Kuiper and William P. Bidelman he observed with the Otto-struve telescope, the second largest telescope after the Hooker telescope at Monte Wilson, and obtained the spectrograms of the eclipse system with extended atmosphere 32 Cygni. During the solar eclipse of 25 February 1952, observed in Sudan, he obtained the daytime spectrum of the sky for the first time.

He was a member of Accademia dei Lincei, International Astronomical Union and the Academy of Sciences of Naples, and died in Naples.

== Award ==
In 1955 the Accademia dei Lincei awarded him the National Prize of the President of the Republic for Astronomy, Geodesy and Geophysics.
