= Emanuele Fergola =

Italian astronomer and mathematician (1830–1915)

- Emmanuele Giuseppe Gabriele Gennaro
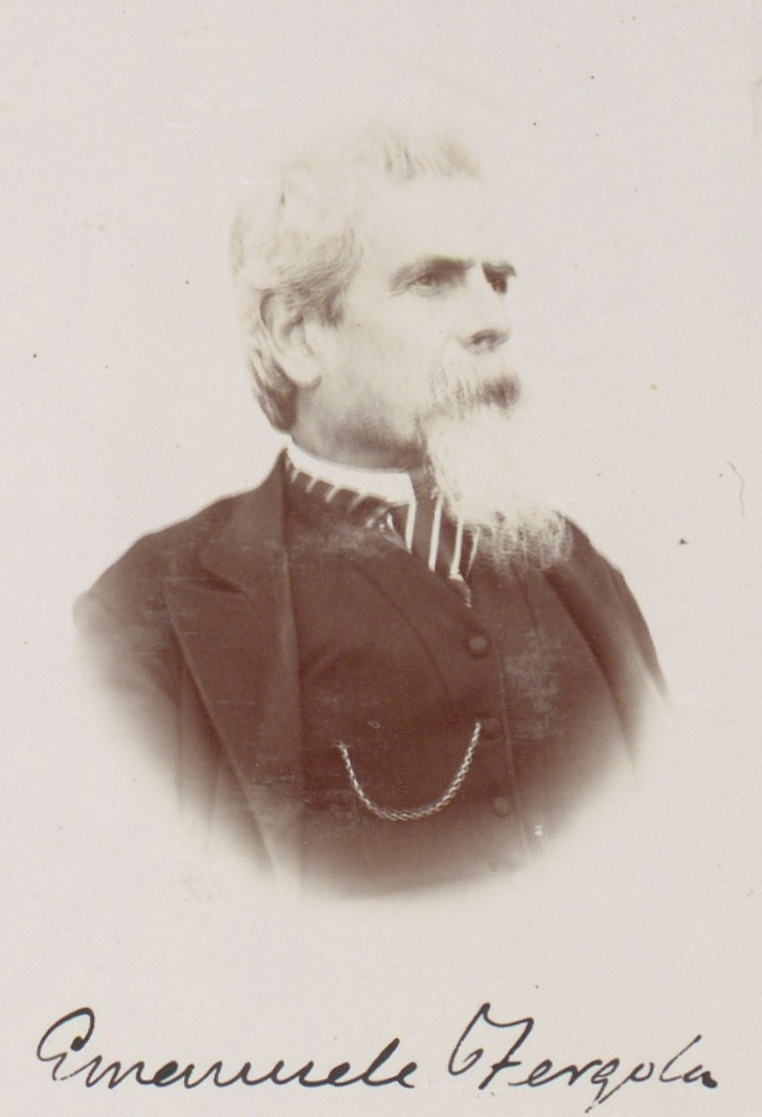
- Emanuele Fergola
- Born: 30 October 1830; Naples, Campania, Italy
- Died: 5 April 1915 (aged 84); Naples, Campania, Italy
- Education: University of Naples
- Scientific career
- Fields: Mathematics, Astronomy, Celestial Mechanics
- Workplaces: Astronomical Observatory of Capodimonte, University of Naples Federico II

Emmanuele Giuseppe Gabriele Gennaro Fergola (Naples, 30 October 1830 – Naples, 5 April 1915) was an Italian astronomer, mathematician, and also Senator of the Kingdom of Italy.

Son of the Bourbon general Gennaro Fergola, he came from a family with an important cultural and artistic tradition. Nicola, a cousin of his grandfather, was the founder of the Neapolitan school of geometry; his uncle Francesco was the most important of the geographic engineers of the Topographical Office directed by Rizzi Zannoni; Salvatore, an official painter of the court of Francis I of Bourbon, was an exponent of landscape painting, the School of Posillipo in the style of Jakob Philipp Hackert.

In 1849 Ernesto Capocci wanted him as a pupil of the Capodimonte Astronomical Observatory, where he spent his entire scientific life. in addition to research activities at the Observatory, from 1855 to 1860 he was a lecturer at the Military College of the Nunziatella. From 1860, he taught at the University of Naples Introduction to calculus, and three years later he became a full professor of higher analysis. With the retirement of Annibale de Gasparis, in 1889 he became the Professor of Astronomy at the University of Naples and the director of the Capodimonte Observatory. For the three-year period 1889-1891 he was Rector of the University of Naples, and also Dean of the Faculty of Mathematical Sciences for the years 1869-1870; 1900-1901; 1905-1906. On 4 March 1905, he was appointed Senator of the Kingdom and in 1909 Professor emeritus of the University of Naples.

His scientific activity dates back to 1850, publishing works of pure mathematics, while the first astronomical publications date back to 1864 with the determination of the orbital elements of some small planets and comets. In 1869 with Angelo Secchi he measured the difference in longitude between Naples and Rome, using - first in Italy - the telegraph to transmit the data. In 1893 he started a program of simultaneous observations with the Columbia College observatory in New York. The cycle of observations led to the determination of a new value of the aberration constant and to a better determination of the Capodimonte latitude.

He was a member of many Italian and European academies, including the Astronomische Gesellschaft (1863) and the Accademia dei Lincei (1884). He was president of the Royal Society of Naples in the years 1895 and 1907 and of the Accademia Pontaniana (1900-1902) and (1906-1908).

In 1909 he retired to private life, leaving the memory of an excellent man who honored science and his country.
