= Antonio Abetti =

Italian astronomer

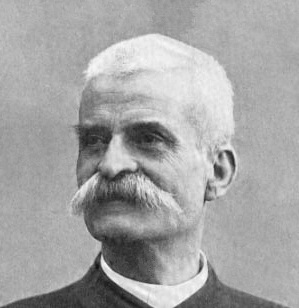
- Born: 19 June 1846; San Pietro di Gorizia, Austrian Empire
- Died: 20 February 1928 (aged 81); Arcetri, Kingdom of Italy
- Education: University of Padua
- Scientific career
- Fields: Astronomy
- Workplaces: Osservatorio Astrofisico di Arcetri

Antonio Abetti (19 June 1846 – 20 February 1928) was an Italian astronomer.

Born in San Pietro di Gorizia (Šempeter-Vrtojba), he earned a degree in mathematics and engineering at the University of Padua. He was married to Giovanna Colbachini in 1879, and they had two sons. He died in Arcetri.

== Work ==
Abetti mainly worked in positional astronomy and made many observations of minor planets, comets, and star occultations. He computed the orbit of 170 Maria, a Main belt asteroid.

In 1874 he was part of an Italian expedition to Muddapur, in India, led by Pietro Tacchini to observe a transit of Venus with a spectroscope. Later he became director of the Osservatorio Astrofisico di Arcetri and a professor at the University of Florence. He refurbished the observatory at Arcetri by installing a new telescope.

== Honours ==
- Member of the Accademia dei Lincei.
- Member of the Royal Astronomical Society.
- The crater Abetti on the Moon is named after both Antonio and his son Giorgio Abetti.
- The minor planet 2646 Abetti is also named after Antonio and his son.
