= Stefano Bardini =

Italian art collector (1836–1922)

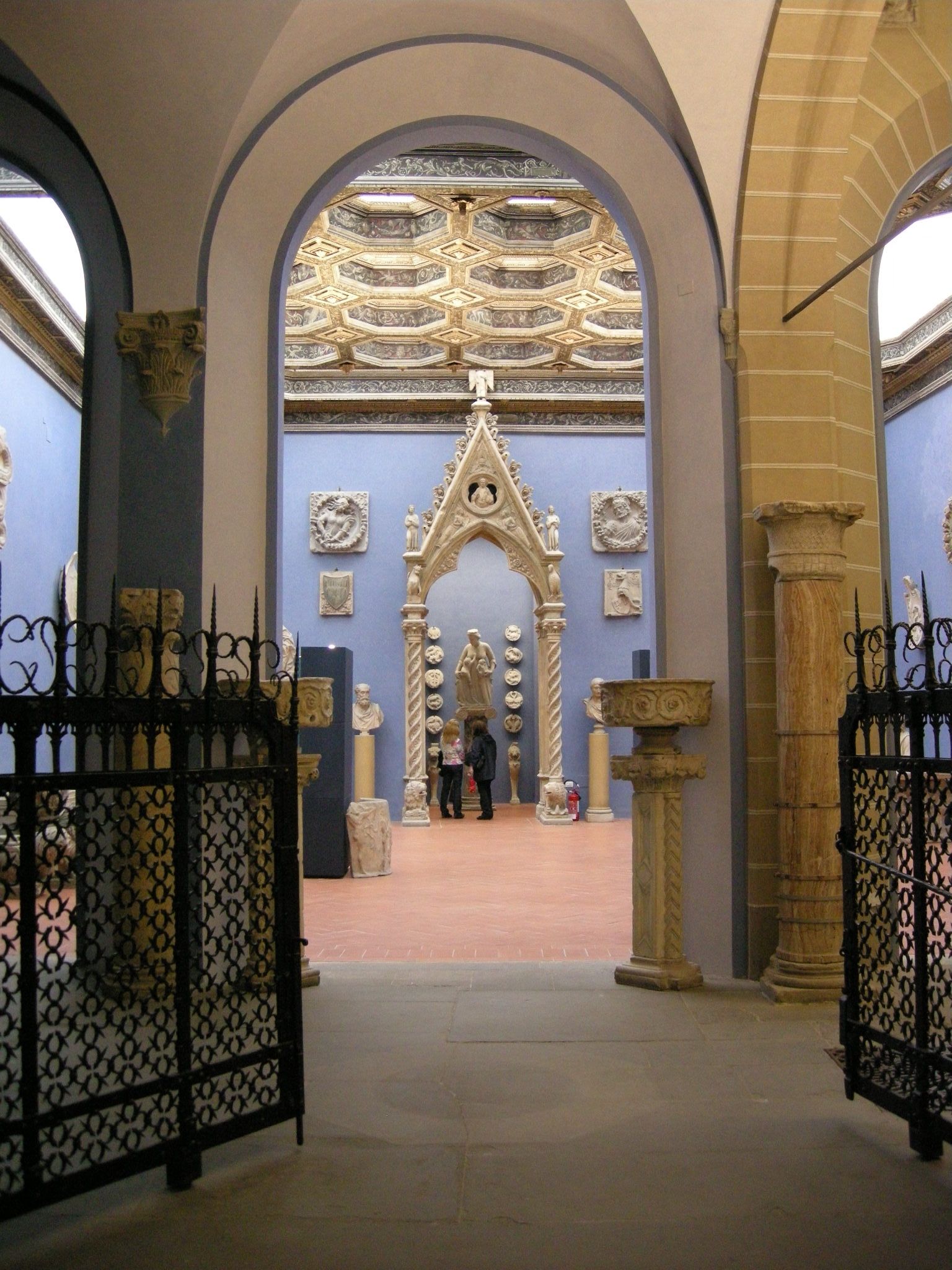
Museo Bardini

Stefano Bardini (1836–1922) was an Italian connoisseur and art dealer in Florence who specialized in Italian paintings, Renaissance sculpture, cassoni and other Renaissance and Cinquecento furnishings and architectural fragments that came on the market during the urban regeneration of Florence in the 1860s and 70s.

Trained as a painter and expert copyist at the Accademia di Belle Arti Firenze from 1854, Bardini received increasing commissions as a restorer and expanded into selling works of art from 1870 onwards.

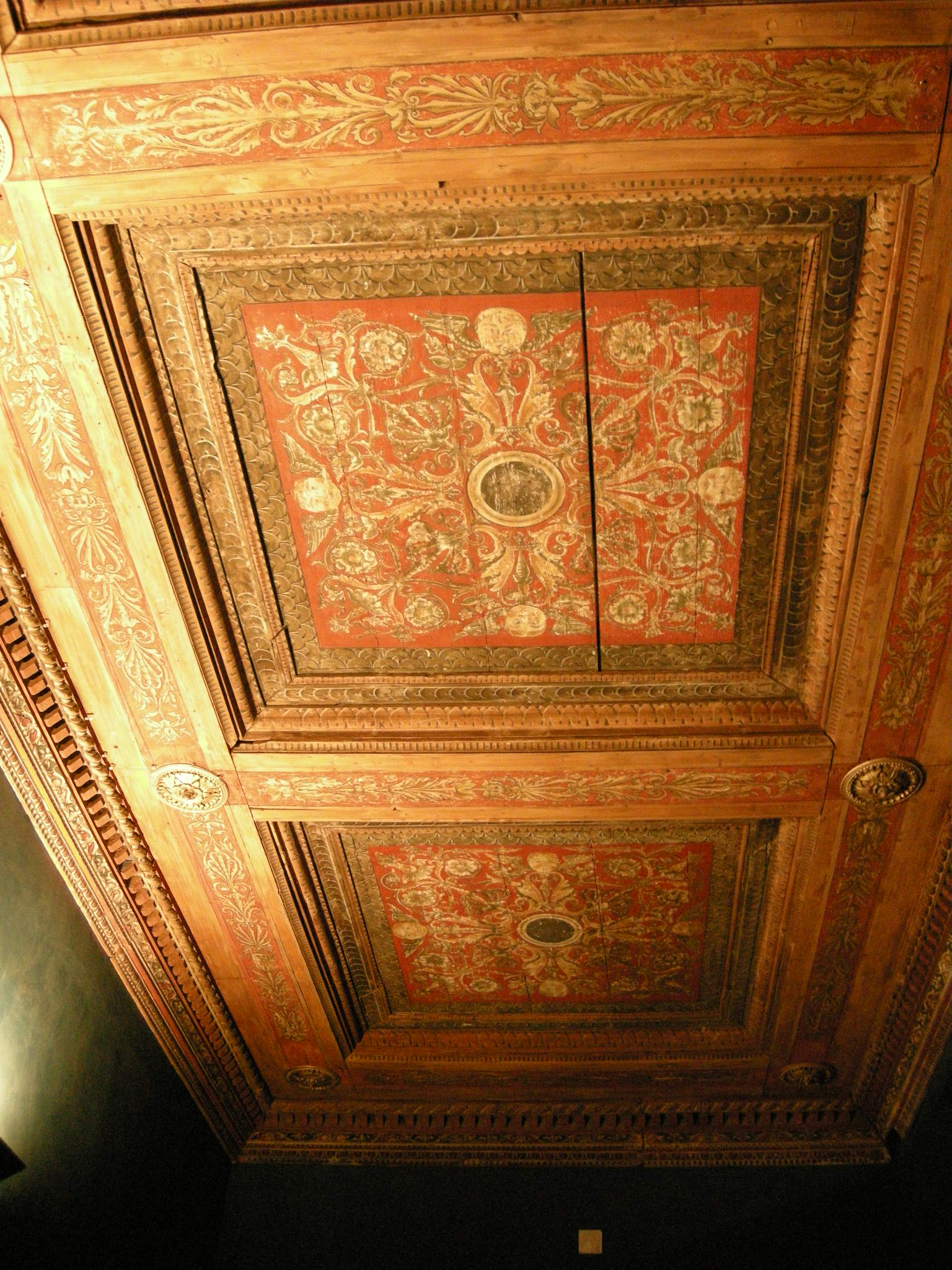
Venetian ceiling in the Museo Bardini

Working as a restorer, Bardini, who already removed some Botticelli frescoes from the Villa Lemmi, was commissioned to remove the frescoes by Jakob Salomon Bartholdy from several of the German Nazarene circle of painters. These circle of pinters are from Casa Bartholdy, Rome, which had been purchased by Berlin, in 1886–87. His esthetic, barely distinguishable restoration of Simone Martini's Saint Catherine of Alexandria, now in the National Gallery of Canada, has been examined as an outstanding example of the seamless restorations that his generation preferred.

Many well-known works of Renaissance art bear a Bardini provenience. The National Gallery of Art, Washington DC, has some twenty works that passed through his hands, notably the Benedetto da Maiano Madonna and Child, the Bernardo Daddi Saint Paul and the Portrait of a Youth by Filippino Lippi. The Metropolitan Museum of Art conserves eight paintings that Bardini once owned, including Veronese's Boy with a Greyhound, and Giovanni di Paolo's Coronation of the Virgin from the Robert Lehman collection, as well as the baroque portrait bust of Ferdinando de' Medici by Giovanni Battista Foggini and an eagle lectern by Giovanni Pisano. Bardini's connections with Bernard Berenson resulted in several of Bardini's purchases finding their way to the Isabella Stewart Gardner Museum, Boston, where Berenson was the guiding light; among them are two North Italian Romanesque stylobate, column-supporting lions and a basin, purchased from Bardini in 1897. The much-damaged marble of a curly-haired youth from the Borghese collection originally belonged to Bardini, later employed by Stanford White as a fountain figure in the Payne Whitney House at 972 Fifth Avenue, New York City, remaining in situ as the house was bought for the French Cultural Services, making headlines in 1996 when it was attributed as a youthful work of Michelangelo. Bardini acted as White's mainstay in Florence for panelling, paintings, sculpture, and Renaissance furnishings, supplying White with two 16th-century wooden ceilings reinstalled in Whitney's palazzo along with other caseloads of works of art he shipped across the Atlantic to White.

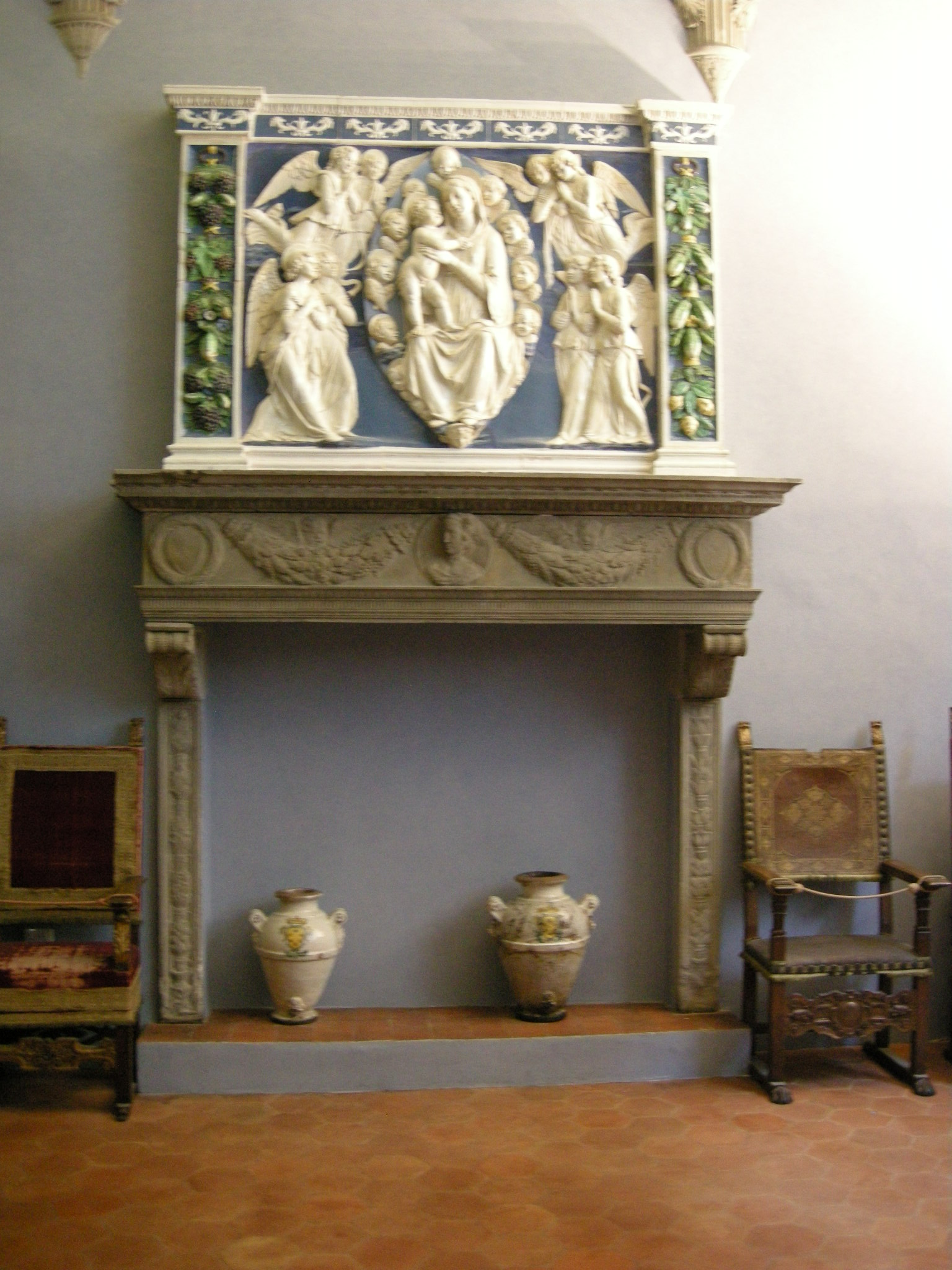
Madonna with Angels, glazed terracotta, by Andrea Della Robbia

In the decades after 1860 he was also responsible for the transformation of many painted cassone panels that had been previously removed from the furniture, which was considered valueless, by creating new carved and part gilded walnut cassoni in the pristine condition that was required of furniture for grand houses. Of such cassoni, the quantity that came onto the market were astonishing: the German art historian Paul Schubring was shown an outbuilding, probably at Bardini's Torre del Gallo, that consisted of a single room in which he counted some 200 cassoni. The archives of the Museo Bardini make it clear that the free restorations and adaptations and imitations sold by Bardini were not misattributed; "confusion set in only half a century later when the heirs of the original owners came to sell the pieces," Ellen Callmann observes. Not all Bardini's cassoni were heavily restored: the famous cassone painted with The Conquest of Trebizond from Palazzo Strozzi, with Strozzi armorial bearings, one of the minority of cassone panels remaining integral to its cassone, is conserved at the Metropolitan Museum of Art.

In 1881 Bardini acquired the deconsecrated church and convent of San Gregorio facing piazza dei Mozzi in the Oltrarno and set about transforming it into his opulent residence and restoration studio, Palazzo Bardini, now housing the Museo Bardini, with his collections of paintings, sculpture, most notably a marble Charity by Tino da Camaino, 15th- and 16th-century Italian furniture, ceramics, tapestry, arms; stringed and keyboard musical instruments, including one of only two surviving oval spinets by Bartolomeo Cristofori; Roman and Etruscan antiquities and 15th- and 16th-century architectural fittings, including paneled and painted ceilings, chimneypieces and door surrounds. His example inspired his most successful protégé, Elia Volpi, to purchase and freely restore Palazzo Davanzati in the heart of Florence, and fill it with a similar range of art.

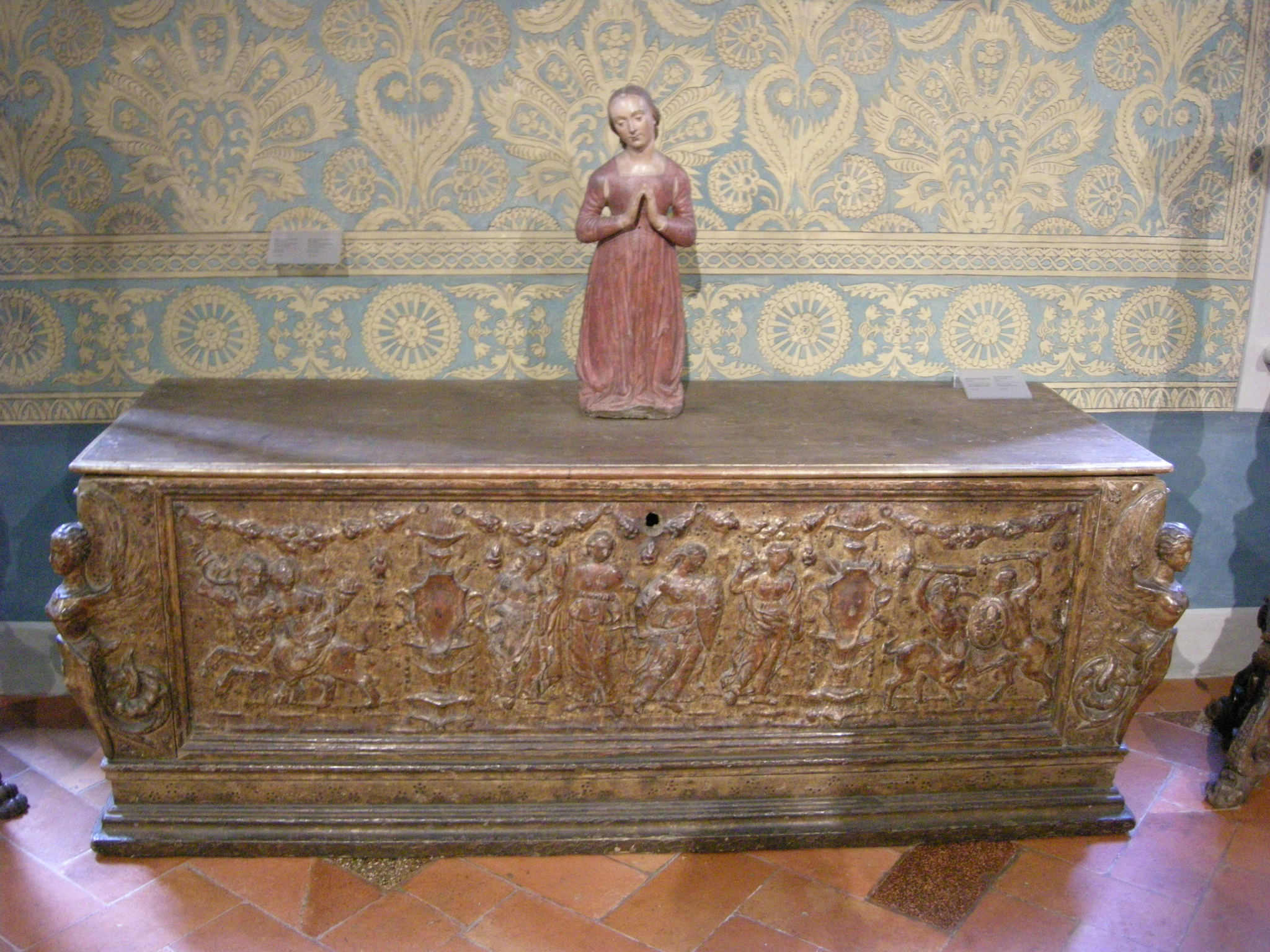
Florentine cassone with gilded pastiglia panel, 15th century

Bardini's extensive connections among impecunious patricians and with dealers and restorers opened many avenues for acquiring works of art. Works of art from the Giampietro Campana collection, dispersed in 1858, later passed, probably indirectly, through Bardini's hands. In 1892 Bardini was commissioned to oversee the dispersal of a major part of the Borghese Collection in Rome. In the spring of 1892 Bardini prepared a lavish catalogue for an auction sale of pieces from his own collection, held at Christie's.

In 1902 he purchased the Torre del Gallo at Pian de' Giullari, in the hills of Arcetri, on top of a ridge with a panoramic view over the city. There he undertook neo-medieval restorations that were carried out between 1904 and 1906.

In winding down his activities, Bardini organized a sale in New York in 1918 that dispersed his sculpture and furniture into American private collections, and which eventually came to American museums. Among the works was a polychromed terracotta of the Virgin and Child that remains firmly attributed to Donatello, "in the small class of autograph Donatello reliefs", as John Pope-Hennessy observed. Lot 427 in the sale was of two Polyclitan marble fragments, a Diadoumenos torso associated with a head possibly of Hermes, both fine Roman copies: they are now in the Walters Art Museum, Baltimore.

His bequest to the city of Florence resulted in the opening of the Museo Bardini in 1923; the Giardino Bardini across from it is also his legacy.

The recent work of Lynn Catterson has corrected much of the often repeated urban legend about Bardini.
