= Arrighetti =

Arrighetti is an Italian surname. Notable people with the surname include:

- Ilaria Arrighetti (born 1993), Italian rugby player
- Nicolò Arrighetti (1709–1767), Italian professor
- Spencer Arrighetti (born 2000), American baseball player
- Valentina Arrighetti (born 1985), Italian volleyball player

== See also ==
- Villa Arrighetti, a villa in Tuscany, Italy
