= Ernesto Capocci =

Italian mathematician, astronomer and politician (1798–1864)

Ernesto Capocci Belmonte
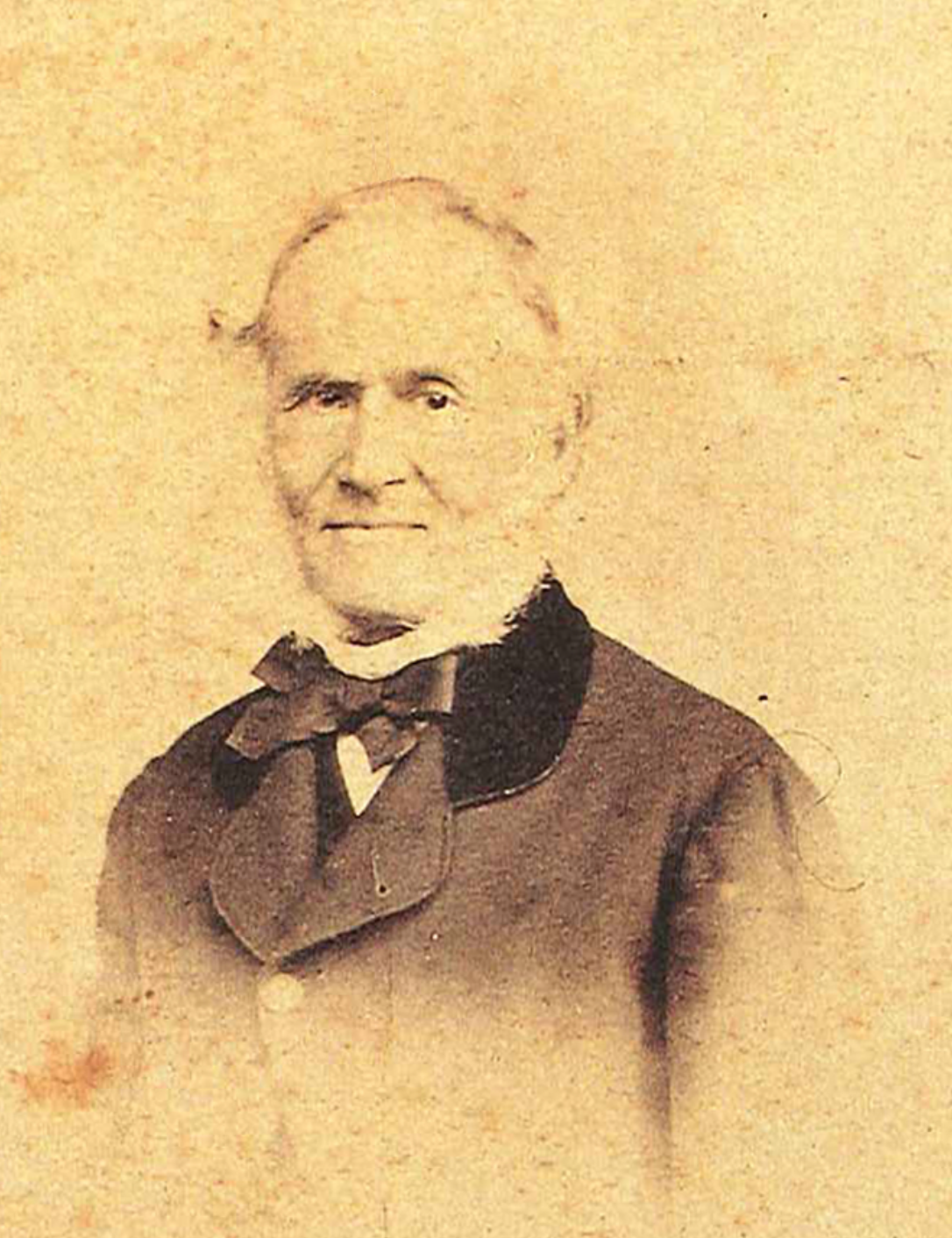
- Ernesto Capocci Belmonte
- Born: 31 March 1798; Picinisco, Italy
- Died: 6 January 1864 (aged 65); Naples, Italy
- Known for: Director of the Astronomical Observatory of Naples; naming of asteroid 10 Hygiea
- Scientific career
- Fields: Mathematics, astronomy, politics, science journalism
- Institutions: Astronomical Observatory of Capodimonte

Ernesto Capocci Belmonte (Picinisco, 31 March 1798 – Naples, 6 January 1864) was an Italian mathematician, astronomer and politician.

From 1815 he was a pupil at the Astronomical Observatory of Naples directed by his uncle Federigo Zuccari. In 1819 he was appointed as assistant astronomer by Giuseppe Piazzi at the new observatory in Capodimonte directed by Carlo Brioschi. In 1833 the king of Naples Ferdinand II appointed him director of the Observatory, but in 1850 he was ousted for having participated with his children in the uprisings of 1848 and for being a supporter of liberal and Risorgimento ideas. He was reinstated in functions by Giuseppe Garibaldi in 1860. He was a member of the Neapolitan Parliament in 1848. On the proposal of Garibaldi, he was appointed senator of the Kingdom of Italy by Vittorio Emanuele II in 1861. The same year he was appointed honorary professor at the University of Naples and president of the Accademia Pontaniana.

He was a prolific popular science author and forerunner of science fiction novels by publishing in 1857 Relazione del primo viaggio alla Luna Otto da una donna, a report of a woman's first trip to the moon realized in 2057, 200 years after the book's publication. The novel was published eight years before Jules Verne's From the Earth to the Moon. On the occasion of the 150th anniversary of the death of Ernesto Capocci, the Capodimonte Observatory organized an exhibition dedicated to the astronomer and published anastatic reprints of some of his popular texts.

In Paris he frequented François Arago and Alexander von Humboldt, prompted Macedonio Melloni to come and live in Naples to direct the Meteorological Observatory on Vesuvius.

He died in 1864 and was buried in the Poggioreale cemetery in Naples. His tomb, embellished with a bust made by Vincenzo Gemito later exhibited in the Capodimonte Observatory Museum, was inaugurated in November 1900 with a speech given by Pasquale Del Pezzo and published in 2015.

== Works ==
- Dialoghi sulle comete scritti in occasione delle cinque apparse nell'anno 1825 (in Italian). Napoli: Stamperia del Giornale del Regno delle Due Sicilie. 1825.
- Il primo viceré di Napoli (in Italian). Parigi, Londra: Baudry et Galignani; Rolandi. 1838.
- Quadro del sistema planetario solare (in Italian). Napoli: Stamperia dell'Iride. 1853.
- Illustrazioni cosmografiche della Divina Commedia (in Italian). Napoli: Stamperia dell'Iride. 1856.
- Relazione del primo viaggio alla luna fatto da una donna l'anno di grazia 2057 (in Italian). Napoli: Tipografia di T. Cottrau. 1857.
- Sull'imminente ritorno della gran cometa del 1556 (in Italian). Napoli: stamp. Del Vaglio. 1857.
- Dei tremuoti in generale e di quello in particolare de 16 dicembre 1858 in Basilicata e Principato ultra (in Italian). Napoli: Stab. Tip. di Teodoro Cottrau. 1858.
- Ai miei amici più o meno rossi (in Italian). Napoli: Tip. dei Classici Italiani. 1862.
- Capocci, Ernesto (1863). La stampa napoletana al signor Pietro Sterbini (in Italian). Napoli.
