= Villa Agape =

Coordinates: 43°45′15.66″N 11°15′30.76″E

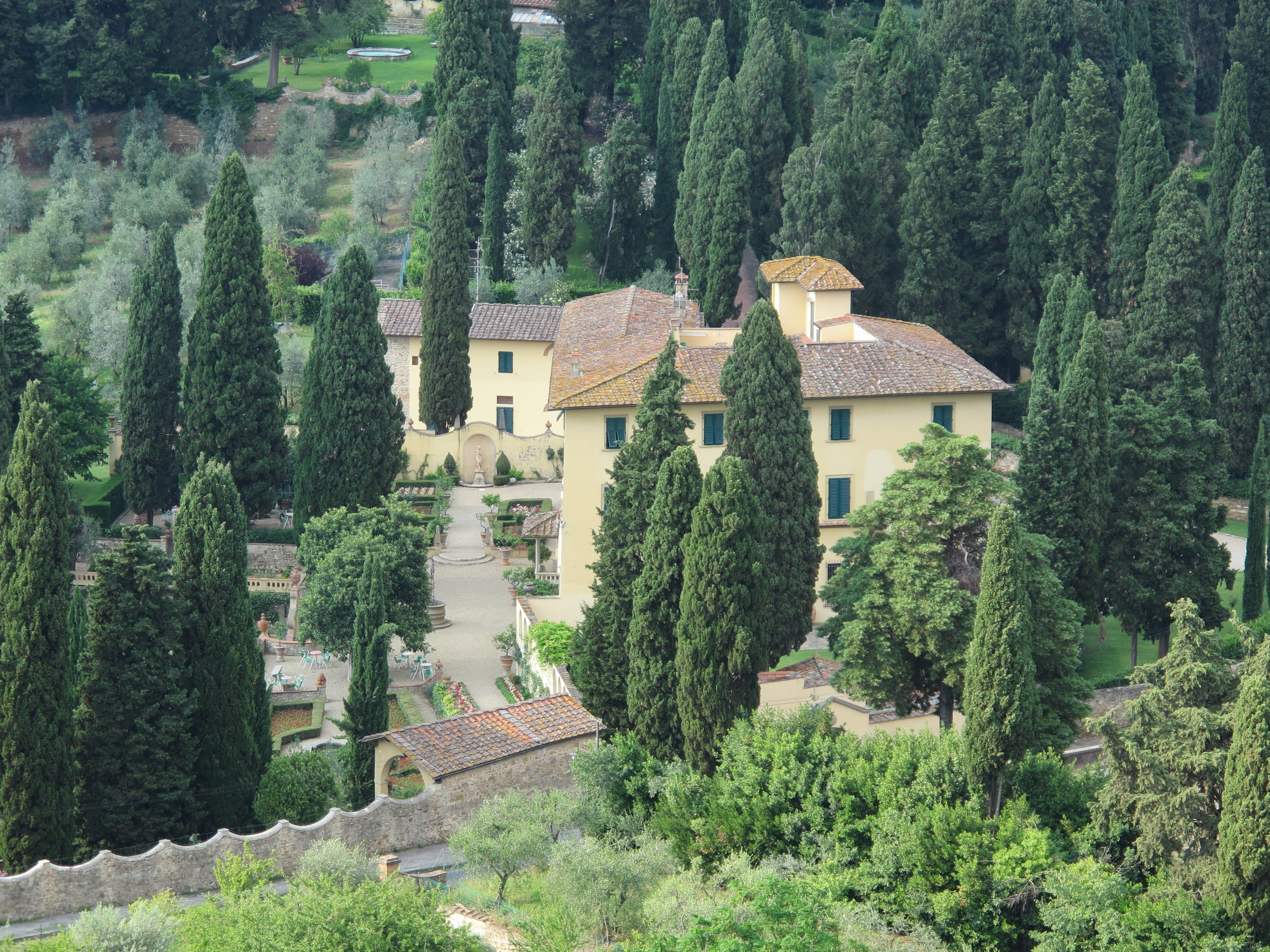
View from Torre del Gallo

Villa Agape, previously named Villa Arrighetti, is a villa in Tuscany, Italy, situated in Florence on the hill of Arcetri, close to Piazzale Michelangelo. The original house was built in 1472, but was rebuilt in its present form by Giulio de Filippo Arrighetti in 1602. Arrighetti was friends with the scientist Galileo, who retired to Arcetri, effectively under house arrest after the condemnation of his theories. A plaque on the wall commemorates their friendship.

The house is also known as Il Galateo or Podere Celline, and was a meeting point in the sixteenth and seventeenth centuries of the "Arcadia dei pastori Antellesi", a cultural party grouping local poets, aristocrats, artists and literary figures.

The house is also notable for its splendid gardens, laid out in the 1950s by Anna d'Orleans. The garden draws on the traditional features of Tuscan gardens, laid out on a steep slope in a series of terraces, and merging with the surrounding countryside.

The house is now called the Villa Agape and was run as a quiet hotel by nuns till 2014. Starting from 2015 Villa Agape became an elegant hotel run by a private company.
