= Federigo Zuccari =

Italian astronomer (1783–1817)

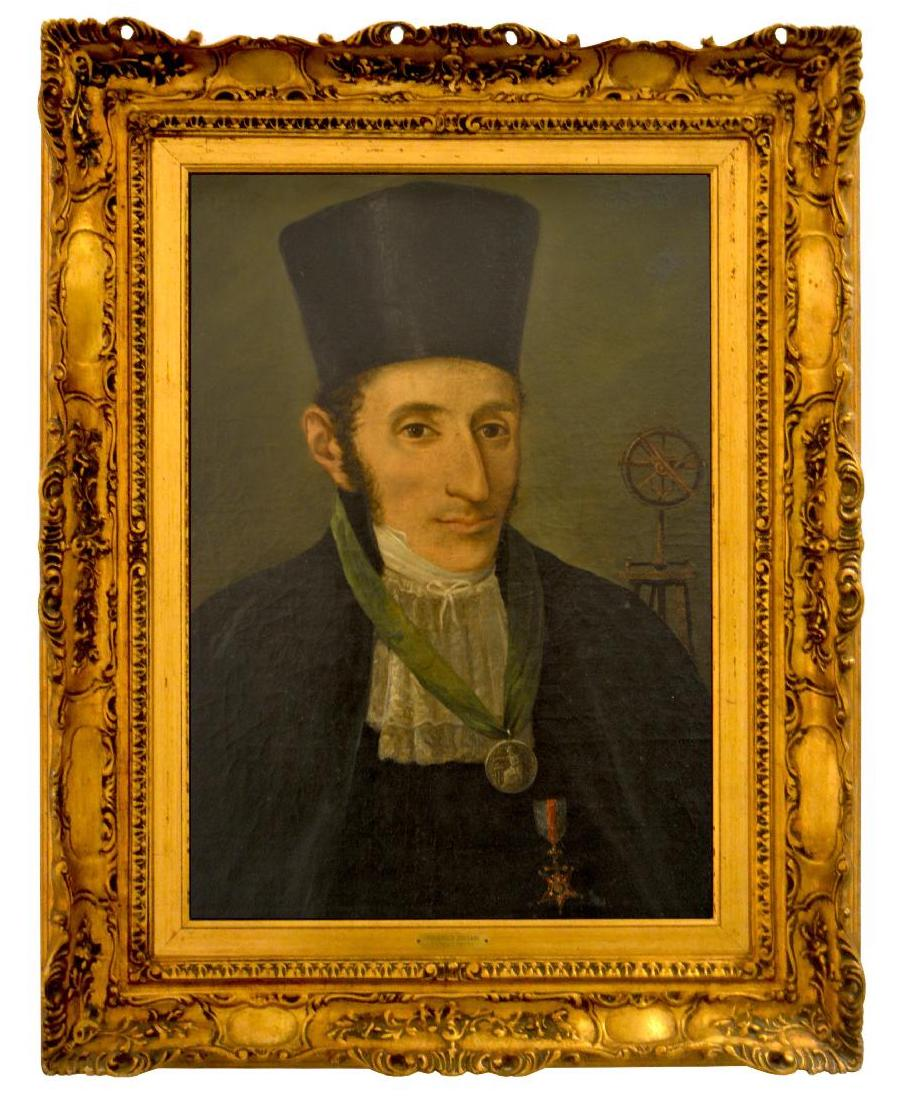
- Oil painting of Federigo Zuccari
- Born: 26 August 1783; Isola di Sora, Terra di Lavoro, Italy
- Died: 15 December 1817 (aged 34); Barra (Naples), Campania, Italy
- Known for: founder of the Astronomical Observatory of Capodimonte
- Scientific career
- Fields: Astronomy
- Workplaces: Astronomical Observatory of Naples, University of Naples Federico II, Polytechnic-Military Schools

Federigo, Vincenzo Antonio, Ludovico Zuccari (Isola di Sora, 26 August 1783 – Barra (Naples), 15 December 1817) was an Italian astronomer, professor of Astronomy at the Naples University, professor of Mathematical Geography at the Military Academy of Naples and director of the Astronomical Observatory of Naples.

He studied in Naples and Rome, also becoming passionate about literature and fine arts. In 1807 he was appointed professor of spherical trigonometry and mathematical geography at the Real Scuola della Nunziatella. After the death of Ferdinando Messia de Prado, Zuccari was sent, in 1809, by King Joachim Murat to Milan at the Brera Observatory to specialize in Astronomy with Barnaba Oriani.

On 17 August 1811 Murat sent him back to Naples, appointing him director of the Observatory located at the ancient monastery of San Gaudioso.

In 1812 the government agreed to the request by Zuccari to erect a new building for the Observatory on Miradois hill near the Royal Palace of Capodimonte. Together with the architect Stefano Gasse he designed a majestic building in neoclassical style whose first stone was laid on 4 November 1812. After the death of Zuccari, the original project was partially modified by Giuseppe Piazzi to make the spaces more functional.

With the few instruments available, at the observatory of San Gaudioso he made observations of the Sun, lunar and solar eclipses and made a long series of measurements of stellar positions. This star catalog was never published for the astronomer's untimely death.

In 1815 he took his nephew Ernesto Capocci as a pupil with whom he also made meteorological observations.

He was a member of the Imperiale e Reale Ateneo Italiano (1810), of the Academy of Sciences of Naples (1811), of the Pontaniana Academy (1812), of the Royal Institute of Encouragement (1812) and knight of the Royal Order of the Two-Sicilies (c. 1814).

== Bibliography ==
- Delle Chiaie, Stefano (1822). "cav. Federico Zuccari". Atti del Real Istituto d'Incoraggiamento alle Scienze naturali di Napoli. III. Napoli: 369–374.
- "Elogio di F. Zuccari". Atti della Società Pontaniana di Napoli. III. Napoli: 74–76. 1819.
- Vaccolini, D. (1834). "Federico Zuccari". Biografia degli Italiani illustri nelle scienze, lettere ed arti. I. Venezia: 324–325.
- Gargano, Mauro; Olostro Cirella, Emilia; Della Valle, Massimo, eds. (2012). Elogio Storico del Cav. Federigo Zuccari, astronomo. Napoli: INAF-Osservatorio Astronomico di Capodimonte. ISBN 9788890729416.
