= Giuseppe Cassella =

Italian astronomer

- Born: 14 October 1755; Cusano Mutri, Kingdom of Naples
- Died: 8 February 1808 (aged 52); Naples, Italy
- Known for: first director of the Astronomical Observatory of Naples
- Scientific career
- Fields: Astronomy, Mathematics
- Institutions: Astronomical Observatory of Naples, University of Naples Federico II, Royal navy academy, Nunziatella Military School

Signature
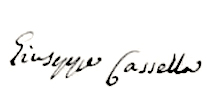

Giuseppe, Antonio Pietro Cassella (14 October 1755, in Cusano Mutri – 8 February 1808, in Naples) was an Italian astronomer, professor of Astronomy at the Naples University and first director of the Astronomical Observatory of Naples.

== Biography ==
Giuseppe Cassella studied mathematics at the University of Naples with Giuseppe Marzucca, and followed Felice Sabatelli's astronomy lessons, becoming his student. He then went to specialize in astronomy at the Padua observatory directed by Abbot Giuseppe Toaldo.

In 1786 he returned to Naples where he taught nautical astronomy at the Marine Academy and mechanics at the Royal College of Artillery. He was also assistant to the chair of astronomy and nautical science held by Ferdinando Messia de Prado.

In 1788 he published the first astronomical ephemeris calculated for the meridian of Naples.

In 1791 he was appointed royal astronomer by Ferdinand IV and asked the king to set up an observatory. In the same year he was granted permission to design it in the east corner of the University Building, now the national archaeological museum. The project was carried out by the Roman architect Pompeo Schiantarelli, but the works were soon abandoned, creating only the sundial in the floor of the "great hall". In 1792 Ferdiando IV commissioned him to build four vertical sundials on the royal palace of Carditello.

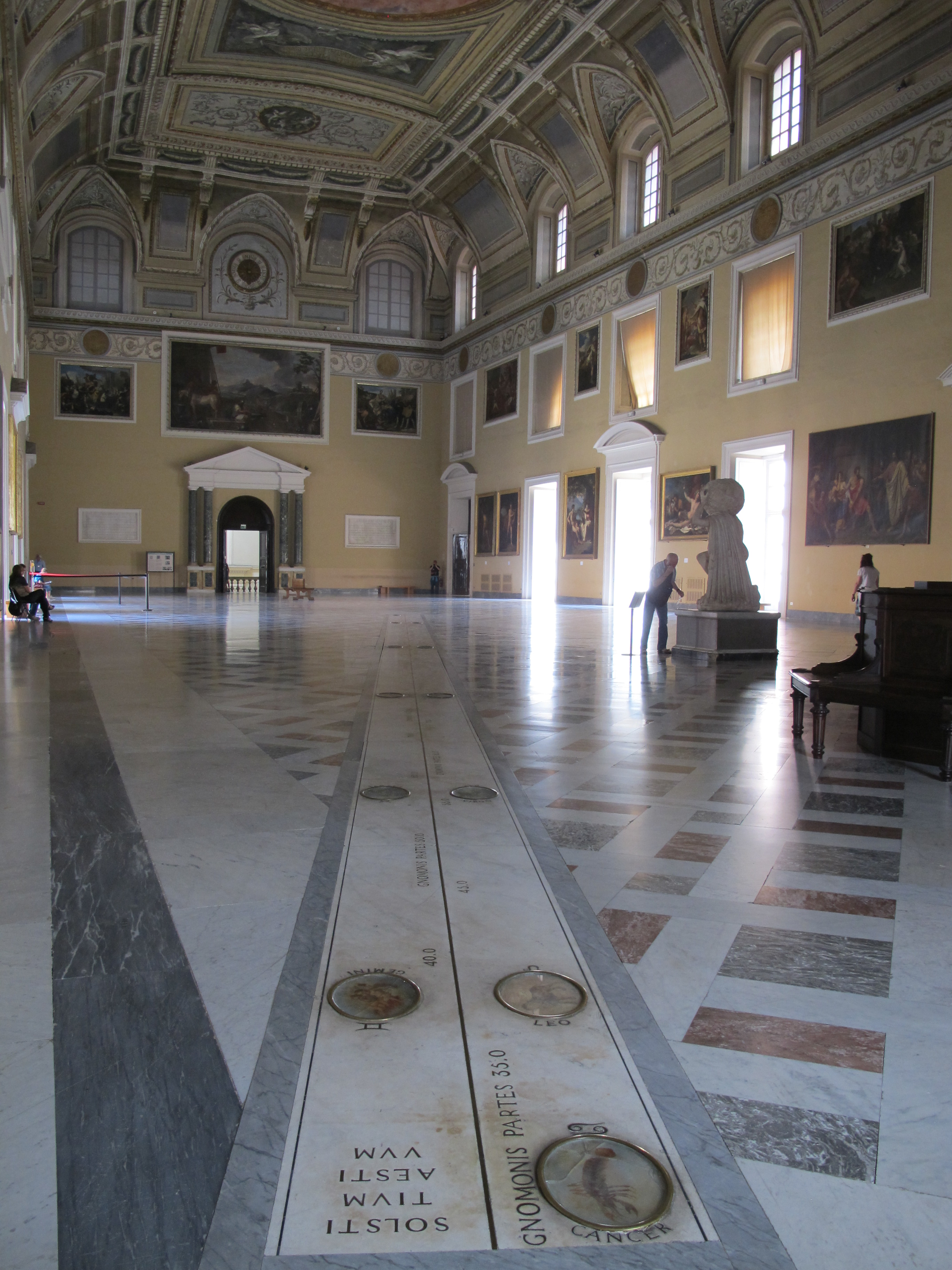
Archaeological Museum of Naples. The sundial realized by Cassella.

In 1807 the new king of Naples, Joseph Bonaparte, signed a decree to install the astronomical observatory of Naples at the ancient monastery of San Gaudioso.

He was a member of the Academy of Sciences, Letters and Arts of Padua (c. 1788), Academy of Sciences of Turin (1797), National Institute of the Neapolitan Republic (1799), Imperiale e Reale Ateneo Italiano (1807), Royal Institute of Encouragement (1807), Italian Academy of Sciences, Letters and Arts of Livorno (1807).

Cassella died in February 1808, due to a serious illness contracted during the observations of the great comet C/1807 R1.

== Works ==
- Cassella, Giuseppe (1788). Dei principali movimenti e fenomeni de' corpi celesti. Tavole calcolate per l'anno comune 1789 al meridiano di Napoli. In Napoli.
- Cassella, Giuseppe (1789–1797). Efemeridi astronomiche per l'anno comune ... calcolate al meridiano di Napoli [da Giuseppe Cassella] ... per comodo e vantaggio degli studiosi dell'astronomia e della navigazione. Napoli.
- Cassella, Giuseppe (1788). Opuscoli di vario argomento di Giuseppe Cassella regio astronomo della Marina dell'Accademia delle scienze, lettere ed arti di Padova. Opuscolo 1. saggio d'un tentativo per risolvere l'equazioni di tutt'i gradi. In Napoli: nella stamperia di Pietro Perger.

== Bibliography ==
- "Giuseppe Cassella". Atti del Real istituto d'incoraggiamento alle scienze naturali di Napoli. 2. Napoli: dalla tipografia di Angelo Trani: 351–355. 1818.
- Ugo Baldini (1978). "Cassella, Giuseppe". Dizionario Biografico degli Italiani (in Italian). Vol. 21: Caruso–Castelnuovo. Rome: Istituto dell'Enciclopedia Italiana. ISBN 978-88-12-00032-6.
- Capaccioli, Massimo; Longo, Giusepe; Olostro Cirella, Emilia (2009). L'astronomia a Napoli dal Settecento ai giorni nostri. Storia di un'altra occasione perduta. Napoli: Guida. ISBN 978-88-6042-659-8.
- Gargano, Mauro (2012). "Giuseppe Cassella". Stardust: the cultural heritage of Italian astronomy (in Italian).
- Gargano, Mauro; Olostro Cirella, Emilia; Della Valle, Massimo (2012). Il Tempio di Urania: progetti per una specola astronomica a Napoli (in Italian). Napoli: INAF-Osservatorio Astronomico di Capodimonte. ISBN 9788890729409.
