= Astronomical Observatory of Capodimonte =

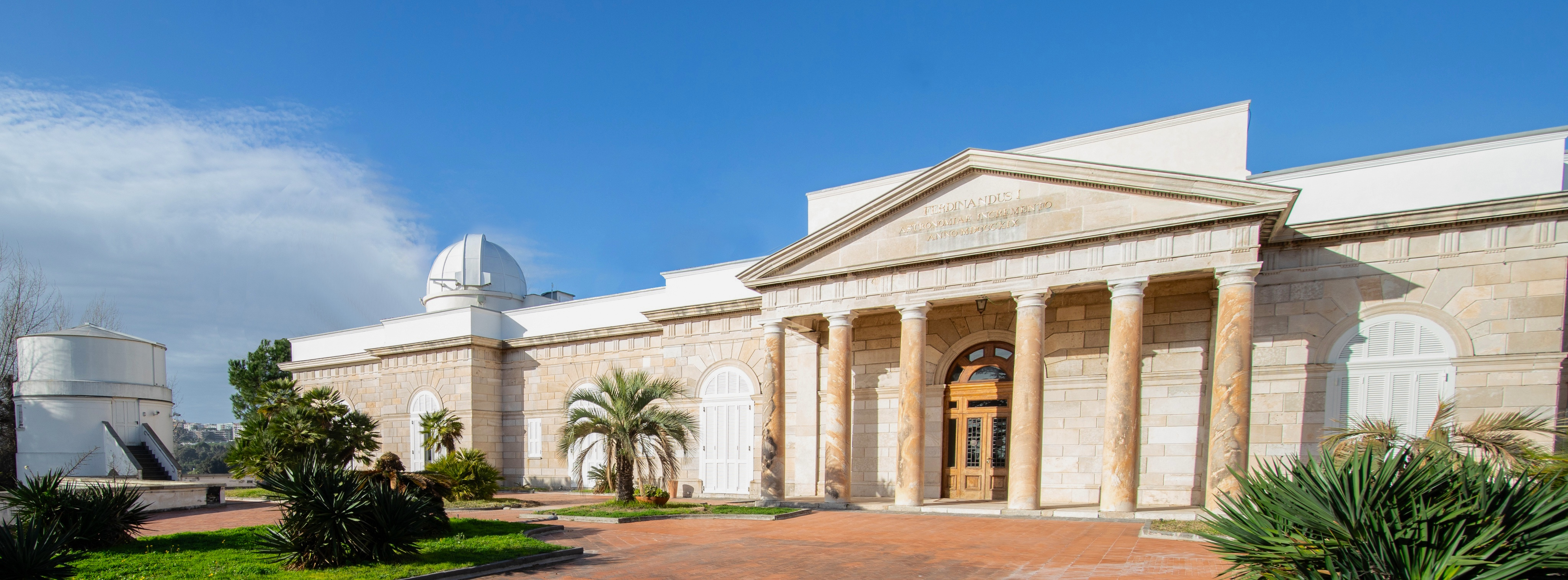

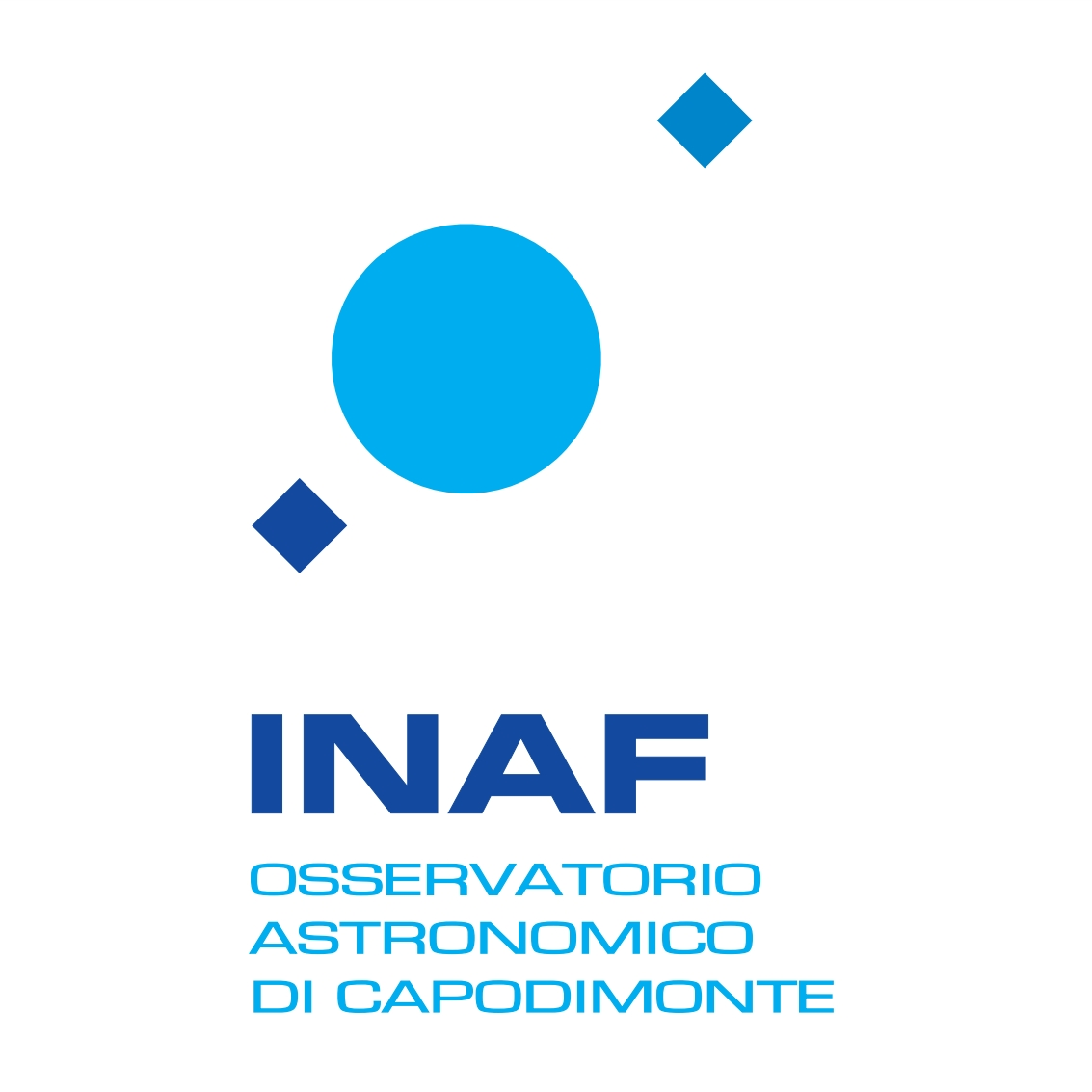
- Alternative names: OAC
- Observatory code: 044
- Location: Naples, Metropolitan City of Naples, Campania, Italy
- Coordinates: 40°51′46″N 14°15′18″E
- Altitude: 150 m (490 ft)
- Established: November 4, 1812
- Website: www.oacn.inaf.it
- Telescopes: Museum of Astronomical Instruments
- Location of Astronomical Observatory of Capodimonte
- Related media on Commons

The Astronomical Observatory of Capodimonte (Italian: Osservatorio Astronomico di Capodimonte) is the Neapolitan department of Istituto Nazionale di Astrofisica (National Institute for Astrophysics, INAF), the most important Italian institution promoting, developing and conducting scientific research in the fields of astronomy, astrophysics, and space science.

The Astronomical Observatory is located in Naples, Italy, on Capodimonte hill. The Observatory is engaged in several international projects, such as Solar Orbiter and ExoMars missions, gravitational waves studies, and observational instruments development for E-ELT, the next generation huge telescope.

The Astronomical Observatory is the oldest scientific institution in Naples, and plays also an important role to promote and disseminate the scientific culture and the astronomical knowledge in the society. For this purpose it houses some outreach facilities like a planetarium and a 40-cm telescope, and owns an important collection of ancient astronomical instruments exhibited in the MuSA-Museum of Astronomical Instruments, and a rare and valuable old books preserved in the Ancient library.

The Astronomical Observatory of Naples was established by Joseph Bonaparte with a decree dated 29 January 1807 in the ancient monastery of San Gaudioso on the Caponapoli hill. The astronomer Giuseppe Cassella was the first director of the Neapolitan specola. When Joachim Murat was appointed king of Naples, he approved 8 March 1812 the foundation of a new Observatory on the Miradois hill, a site not far from the royal palace of Capodimonte. The astronomer Federigo Zuccari and the architect Stefano Gasse conceived a monumental building in the neoclassical style, the first to be designed in the capital of the Kingdom of Naples. On 4 November 1812 the foundation stone of the new observatory was laid with a solemn ceremony presided over by Interior Minister Giuseppe Zurlo. Defined by the astronomer Franz Xaver von Zach "The Vesuvius of Astronomy erupting gold", the new observatory was equipped with a most advanced collection of new telescopes, like the Fraunhofer equatorial telescope with an objective of 17.5 cm, the biggest one ever made until that time, and two repeating circle realised by the Reichenbach & Utzschneider Company in Munich.

In 1812 Zuccari established also an astronomical library in the san Gaudioso observatory. In four years the collection grew from 195 to 620 books. Zuccari acquired some of these books from the Berlin astronomer Johann Elert Bode, the secretary of Neapolitan embassy in Vienna Severo Gargani, and the Paris booksellers of the King of the Two Sicilies, Borel and Pichard.

In the middle of 1815, Ferdinand I was back to being the king of Naples and he called in the capital the astronomer Giuseppe Piazzi to supervise the conclusion of building works with the help of Pietro Bianchi, the architect of Basilica of San francesco di Paola. The new observatory was completed in the autumn of 1819. The astronomer Carlo Brioschi made the first observation from the Observatory est dome in the night of 17 December 1819 observing the star α Cassiopeia.

== Directors ==
- Giuseppe Cassella (1791–1808)
- Ferdinando Messia de Prado (1809–1810)
- Federigo Zuccari (1811–1817)
- Carlo Brioschi (1817–1833)
- Ernesto Capocci (1833–1850)
- Leopoldo Del Re (1850–1855) interim
- Leopoldo Del Re (1855–1860)
- Ernesto Capocci (1860–1864)
- Annibale de Gasparis (1864–1889)
- Emanuele Fergola (1889–1909)
- Francesco Contarino (1910–1912)
- Azeglio Bemporad (1912–1932)
- Luigi Carnera (1932–1948)
- Attilio Colacevich (1948–1953)
- Tito Nicolini (1953–1955) appointee
- Massimo Cimino (1955–1957)
- Tito Nicolini (1957–1969)
- Mario Rigutti (1969–1992)
- Massimo Capaccioli (1993–2005)
- Luigi Colangeli (2005–2010)
- Massimo Della Valle (2010–2017)
- Marcella Marconi (2018–2023)
- Pietro Schipani (2024– )

== See also ==
- List of astronomical observatories
- Simone Zaggia
