= Simone Zaggia =

Italian astronomer (born 1965)

Simone Zaggia is an Italian astronomer. He was born in 1965 and did undergraduate work at the University of Padua, where he also received his Ph.D. in 1996. He has done post-doctoral work at the European Southern Observatory and the Capodimonte Observatory, he worked at Trieste Observatory and currently (2007) works at Padua Observatory. Zaggia's research interest include the dynamics of dwarf galaxies and globular clusters.

== See also ==
- List of Italian scientists
