= Abetti (crater) =

Lunar impact crater

- Coordinates: 19.9°N 27.7°E
- Diameter: 1.60 km (0.99 mi)
- Depth: None
- Colongitude: 332° at sunrise
- Eponym: Antonio Abetti; Giorgio Abetti

Abetti is a small lunar impact crater that has been completely submerged by mare lavas. It forms a 'ghost crater' in the surface, showing only a curved rise where the rim is located. Abetti is located near the southeast edge of Mare Serenitatis, to the west of the Mons Argaeus. This crater is generally visible only at low angles of illumination.

This crater is named after two Italian astronomers, Antonio Abetti (1846–1928) and his son Giorgio (1882–1982). The name was officially adopted into lunar nomenclature by the International Astronomical Union in 1976.
