= Torre del Gallo =

Historic building in Florence, Italy

Coordinates: 43°45′6.93″N 11°15′30.79″E

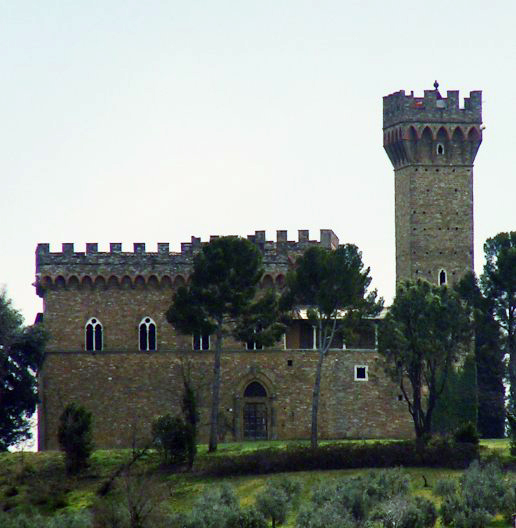
Torre del Gallo.

The Torre del Gallo is a historical building located in Florence, Italy, located at Pian de' Giullari, in the hills of Arcetri, on top of a ridge overlooking the city where there is a magnificent panorama.

== History ==
=== Origins ===
In ancient times it was part of a genuinely fortified castle on the hill, strategically close to Florence. According to some historians, it belonged to the family Galli (or Gallo), who were of very ancient origin. An emblem written in Gothic calligraphy still remains in stone near a plaque located on one of the walls of the courtyard. Taking advantage of their position, the family demanded a toll from people coming down towards Florence from Impruneta. The fortress was partially demolished in 1280 due to the conflict between the Guelphs and Ghibellines. Further damage was inflicted in 1364 following the devastation of raids by the condottiero John Hawkwood, who ravaged the hills of Arcetri with "iron and fire".

=== The Lanfredini ===
The tower was later sold to Lamberteschi, who proceeded to rebuild it. It was then resold in 1464 to the brothers Jacopo and Giovanni Lanfredini, who had owned neighbouring Villa la Gallina since the end of the fourteenth century. The Torre del Gallo passed to their descendants until the end of the family line in 1741, with the death of Cardinal Giacomo Lanfredini, Bishop of Osimo and Cingoli.

Some key moments in the history of the castle were experienced during the siege of Florence (1529-1530), when Pier Maria III de' Rossi, Count of San Secondo, the nephew of Giovanni dalle Bande Nere and commander of the Imperial troops, made it their headquarters with his troops hosted by Bartolomeo Lanfredini: from the top of the tower a hail of artillery were directed towards the area of Villa Giovannelli against the fortifications of San Miniato al Monte.

=== The Galilean Museum and Stefano Bardini ===
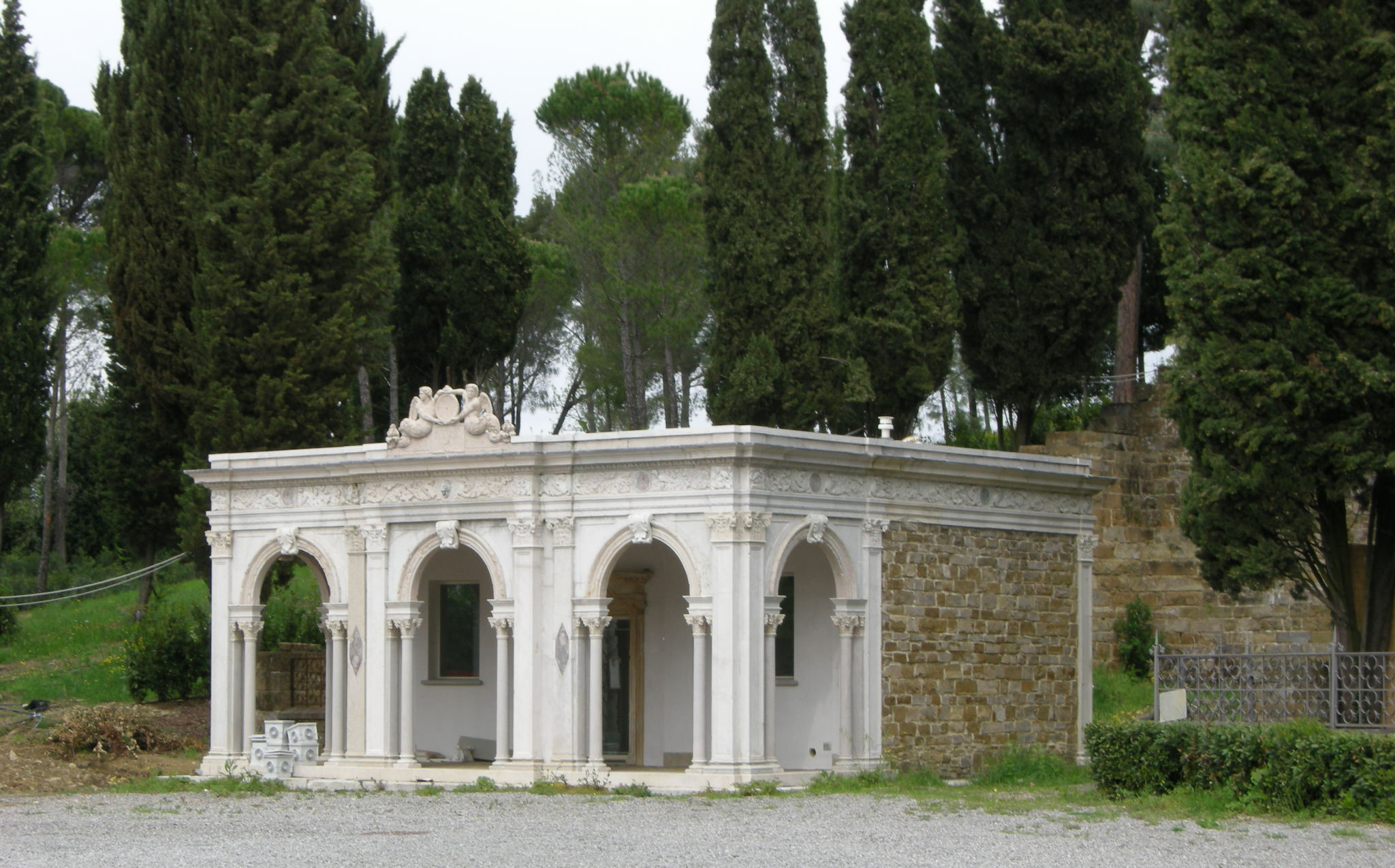
The loggetta.

In 1872, after several changing of hands, the tower came to Count Paolo Galletti who opened a small museum dedicated to Galileo, in which busts, portraits and heirlooms were housed. Now, they are mostly found in the Museo di Storia della Scienza in Piazza dei Giudici. The count commissioned painter Gaetano Bianchi to create frescoes in the rooms of the museum.

The present appearance of the tower, however, is the result of the neo-medieval restoration style, which was carried out between 1904 and 1906 from the antiques dealer Stefano Bardini, who bought the tower in 1902 and was also responsible for the Museo Bardini. A court with three balconies (some attributed to Brunelleschi) remained from the fifteenth century structure. Meanwhile the outer building and the tower were a complete reconstruction, although it was possible to use ancient materials retrieved from recent demolitions caused by the reorganization of Florence. A second courtyard was added, as well as a garden, a Renaissance-style loggia, near the entrance in Via Torre del Gallo, and a detached building used as a laboratory stock.

Inside, the eclectic character of the materials re-used from different times and places are more obvious: windows, columns, portals, wells, and antique fireplaces recreate the picturesque surroundings, but are not very convincing, historically. The work was concluded in 1907, as testified by a plaque.

=== Contemporary times ===
The area was abandoned during the period between the two world wars. During World War II, the building was occupied by the Military Pharmaceutical Institute, then by the Fascist Federation, and, after requisition by the British troops, it became a prison camp. During this period some of the decorations were lost or destroyed.

Today the building is privately owned.

== Architecture ==
The villa, which is dominated by the tall tower, has a large hall with an octagonal vaulting, and an entry with graffiti, perhaps from the Renaissance. The court attributed to Brunelleschi is surrounded by Corinthian columns and arches on three sides, while the second neo-gothic courtyard is decorated with many coats of arms belonging to the owners of the villa and ones Bardini added.

The marble terrace is inspired by the Renaissance Venetian style of Jacopo Sansovino, who adorned the park and some ruins with a monumental fountain.

The great hall on the south side of the park, near the Villa La Gallina, was the laboratory-warehouse Bardini. Left unoccupied, it has now been restored and converted into residences.

== Sources ==
- Gerini, Bettino (2005). Vivere Firenze... Il Quartiere 3. Florence: Aster Italia.
- Document about the Torre del Gallo
