= San Michele a Monteripaldi =

Building in Florence, Italy

Church of San Michele a Monteripaldi (Chiesa di San Michele a Monteripaldi)
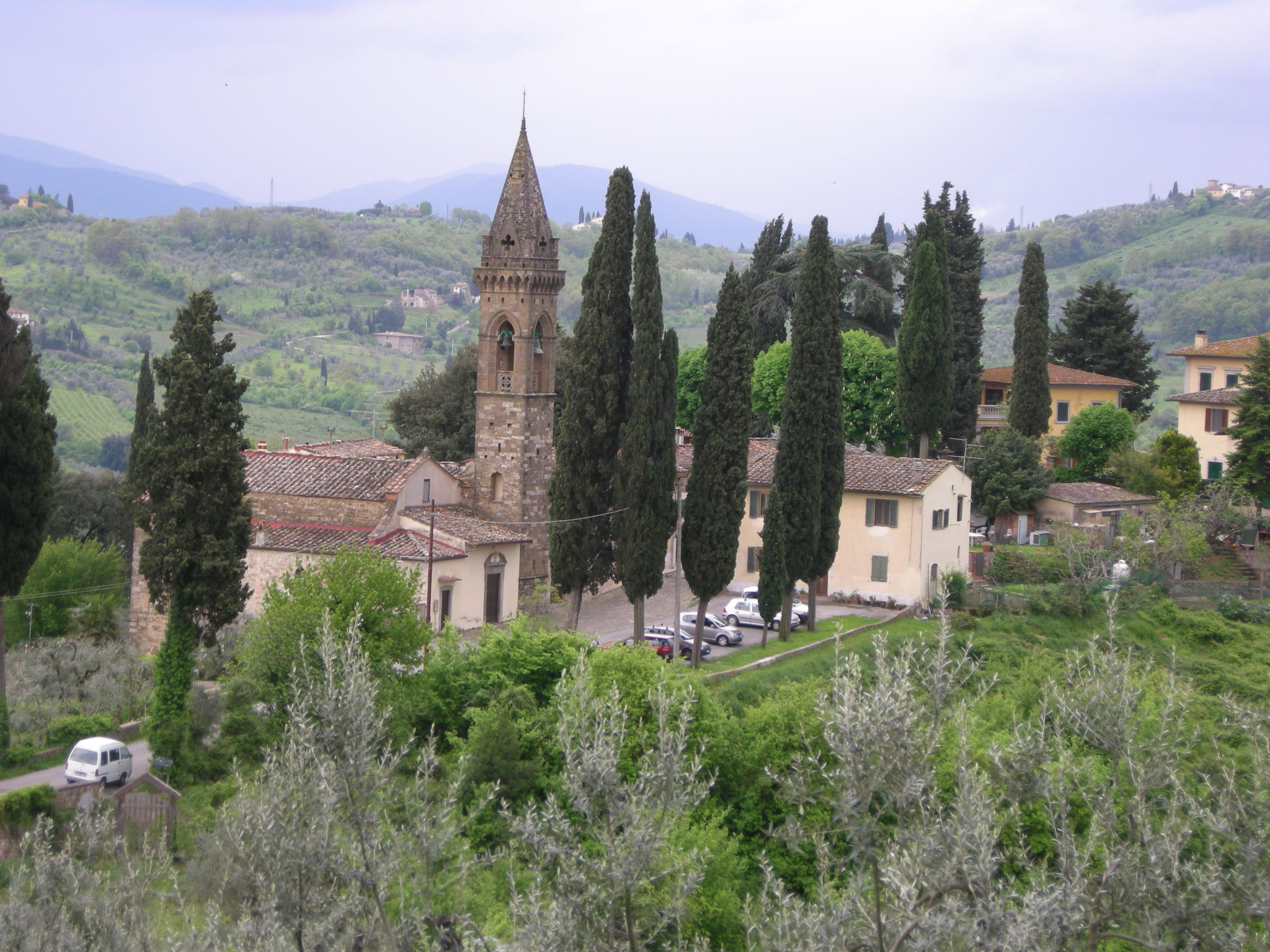
- Façade of the church.

Religion
- Affiliation: Roman Catholic
- Province: Florence

Location
- Location: Florence, Italy
- Interactive map of Church of San Michele a Monteripaldi (Chiesa di San Michele a Monteripaldi)
- Coordinates: 43°44′25″N 11°15′26″E

Architecture
- Type: Church
- Style: Romanesque
- Groundbreaking: 11c

San Michele a Monteripaldi is a Roman Catholic church located in the suburban neighborhood of the same name south of the urban center of Florence, Italy.

== History ==
The first documentation of the church is from 1138, but the dedication to the Archangel Michael suggests founding during the Lombard kingdom. Like many churches to this saint, the church is located on a hilltop. In 1271, what had been a small chapel or oratory, became attached to a convent for nuns, under the patronage of the Bardi family. Their patronage, including the privilege of appointing rectors, continued when the convent was closed, and the building became a parish church. The site was occupied by the besieging imperial and papal armies in 1529. During 1548, the rector was Giovanni della Casa, author of the Galateo. Over the centuries, it underwent numerous refurbishments. In 1871, a tall neo-gothic belltower was built by Adolfo Mariani. In 1962, restorations attempted to adhere to the Romanesque layout and style. Among the works inside the church in 1907, was an altarpiece depicting San Carlo Borromeo by Francesco Curradi.
