= Arcetri =

Location in Florence, Italy

- Neighbourhood
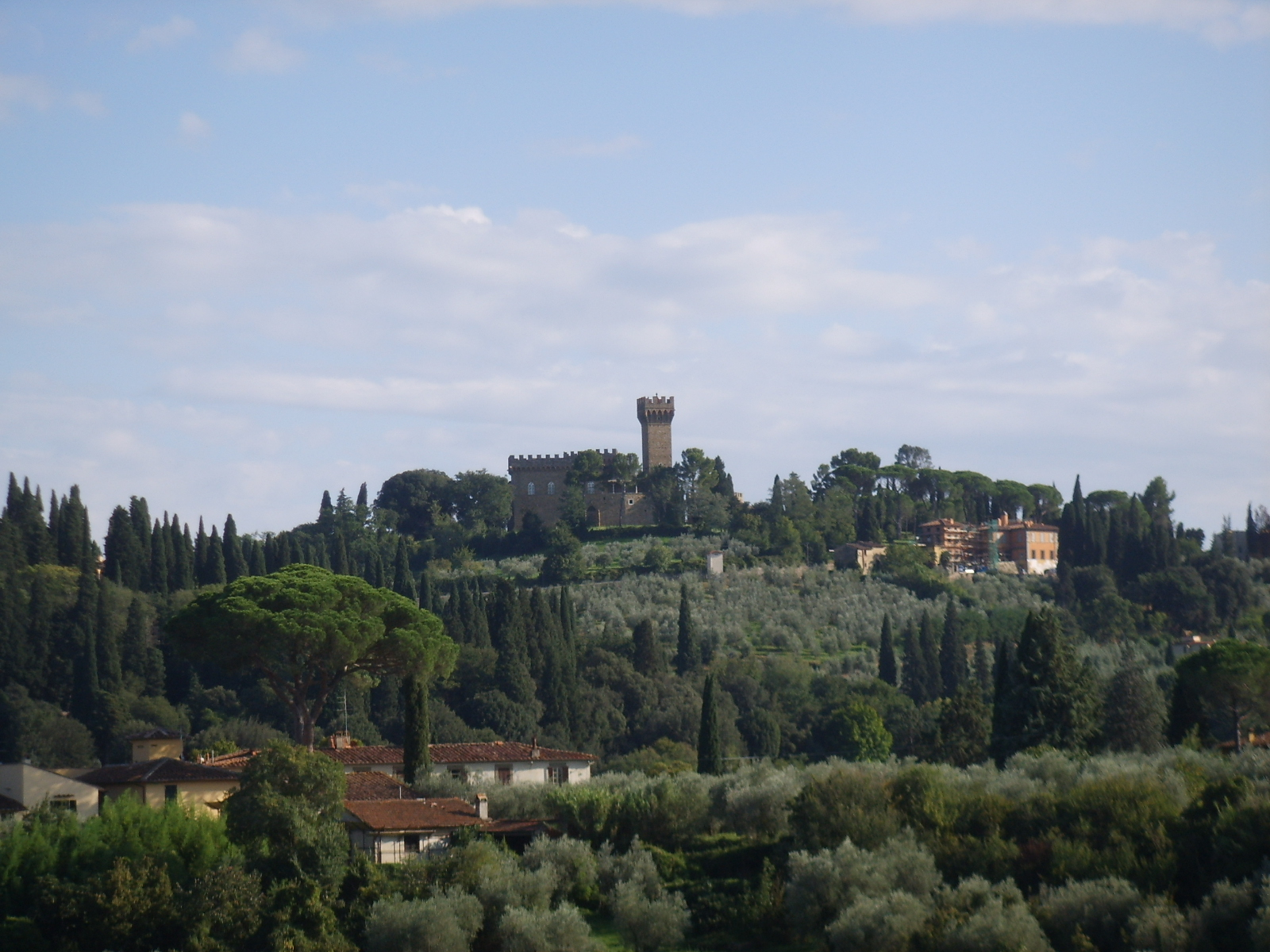
- Interactive map of Arcetri
- Coordinates: 43.75485°N 11.2518°E
- Country: Italy
- Region: Tuscany
- Metropolitan city: Florence
- Comune: Florence
- Quarter: 3 (Gavinana-Galluzzo)
- Time zone: UTC+1 (CET)
  - Summer (DST): UTC+2 (CEST)

Arcetri is a neighbourhood in Florence, Italy, positioned among the hills south of the city centre.

== Landmarks ==
A number of historic buildings are situated there, including the house of the scientist Galileo Galilei (called Villa Il Gioiello), the Convent of San Matteo and the Torre del Gallo. The Arcetri Observatory is also located there. The church of San Leonardo in Arcetri is the main church of the area.

Galileo Galilei died there on 8 January 1642.

=== List of landmarks ===
The following is a longer list of landmarks in the Arcetri area, with their Italian names:

- San Leonardo in Arcetri (Saint Leonard at Arcetri Church)
- San Matteo in Arcetri (Saint Matthew at Arcetri Church)
- Osservatorio Astrofisico di Arcetri (Arcetri Astrophysical Observatory)
- Pian dei Giullari (Jesters Plateau)
- Villa Capponi
- Villa Il Giullarino
- Villa di Volsanminiato
- Torre del Gallo (Tower of the Rooster)
- Villa La Gallina
- Villa Agape-Arrighetti
- Villa Giramonte
- Villa Giovannelli
- Villa Nunes Vais
- Villa Il Teatro
- Villa Pian dei Giullari
- Villa Masieri
- Villa Il Gioiello
- Villa Le Corti
- Villa Pazzi
- Villa Ravà
- Villa Il Roseto
- Fondazione Spadolini (Spadolini Foundation)
- Monteripaldi
- San Michele a Monteripaldi (Saint Michel at Monteripaldi Church)
- Santa Margherita a Montici (Saint Margaret at Montici Church)

== See also ==
- Tommaso Perelli
