= Carlo Brioschi (astronomer) =

Italian astronomer and geodesist

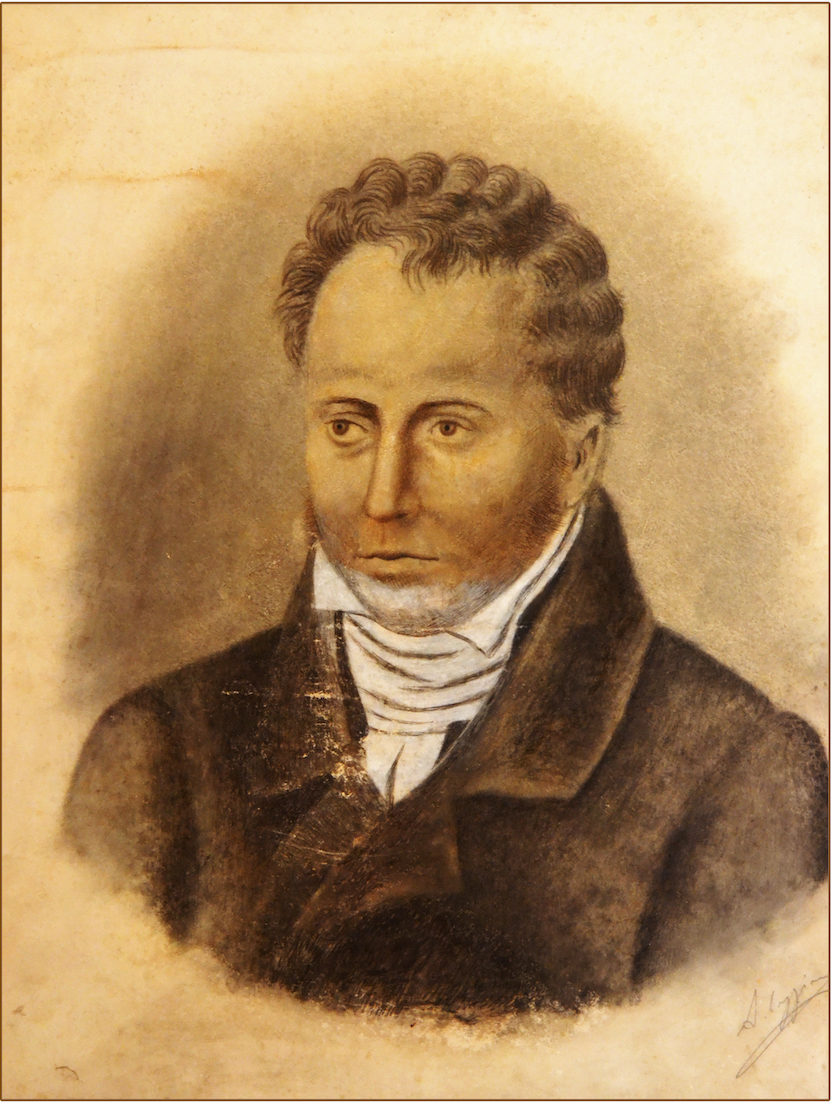
- portrait of Carlo Brioschi
- Born: 15 August 1782; Milan, Italy
- Died: 29 January 1833 (aged 50); Naples, Italy
- Known for: director of the Astronomical Observatory of Capodimonte
- Scientific career
- Fields: Astronomy, Geodesy
- Institutions: Astronomical Observatory of Capodimonte, University of Naples Federico II

Carlo, Maria Rocco Francesco Saverio Brioschi (15 August 1782 in Milan – 29 January 1833 in Naples) was an Italian astronomer and geodesist, professor of astronomy at the University of Naples and director of the Astronomical Observatory of Capodimonte. On the evening of 17 December 1819, he made the first astronomical observation from the new Capodimonte Observatory by measuring the zenith distance of α Cassiopeiae with the Reichenbach multiplier (or repeater) circle housed in the east dome. In 1824 he published the first and only volume of his stellar catalog: Comentarj astronomici della Specola reale di Napoli.

== Bibliography ==
- Federico Amodeo (1905). Vita matematica napoletana. Studio storico, biografico e bibliografico (PDF). Napoli: Tip. F. Giannini e Figli.
- Massimo Capaccioli, Giuseppe Longo e Emilia Olostro Cirella (2009). L'astronomia a Napoli dal Settecento ai giorni nostri. Storia di un'altra occasione perduta. Napoli: Guida Editori. ISBN 978-88-6042-827-1.
- Dizionario Biografico degli Italiani (in Italian). Rome: Istituto dell'Enciclopedia Italiana. 1960–2020. OCLC 883370.
- Emilia Olostro Cirella (1995). "Per una storia dell'Osservatorio astronomico di Capodimonte: gli anni dal 1735 al 1812". Mamorie della Società Astronomica Italiana. CXVI (4): 795–812. Bibcode:1995MmSAI..66..795O.
- Giuseppe Piazzi (1821). Ragguaglio del Reale Osservatorio di Napoli eretto sulla collina di Capodimonte. Napoli: Tip. Francese.
- "Archivio di Stato di Napoli: Stato civile della restaurazione (quartieri di Napoli): San Carlo all'Arena: Morti 1933: Immagine 39". Antenati: Gli Archivi per la Ricerca Anagrafica. 1833. Archived from the original on 2021-04-23.

== See also ==
"Carlo Brioschi". Polvere di stelle: i beni culturali dell'astronomia italiana. 2012.
