= Giorgio Abetti =

Italian solar astronomer (1882–1982)

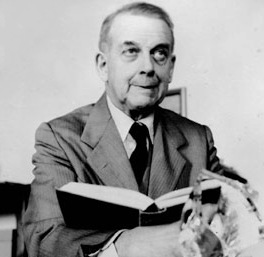
- Abetti in 1940
- Born: 5 October 1882; Padua, Italy
- Died: 24 August 1982 (aged 99); Florence, Italy
- Scientific career
- Fields: astronomy
- Workplaces: Collegio Romano

Prof Giorgio Abetti HFRSE (5 October 1882 – 24 August 1982) was an Italian solar astronomer.

== Life ==
He was born in Padua, the son of noted astronomer Antonio Abetti. He was educated at the Universities of Padua and of Rome. He began his career at the Collegio Romano observatory in Rome as an assistant astronomer.

In the First World War, he served in the Corps of Engineers with the Italian Army.

In 1921, he succeeded his father as the director of the Osservatorio Astrofisico di Arcetri, and continued until 1957. From 1925, he was also a professor at the University of Florence, and continued in this capacity until 1957.

Giorgio Abetti is noted for having led expeditions to observe solar eclipses to Siberia (1936) and Sudan (1952). He was also a visiting professor at the University of Cairo in 1948–49. He was the vice president of the International Astronomical Union in 1938, and received the Medaglia d'argento from the Italian Geographic Society (1915), the Premio reale from the Accademia dei Lincei (1925), and the Janssen medal (1937).

In 1937, Abetti received the Prix Jules Janssen, the highest award of the Société astronomique de France, the French astronomical society.

The crater Abetti on the Moon and asteroid 2646 Abetti are named to honour both him and his father.

He died in Florence on 24 August 1982.

== Bibliography ==
He is the author of several popular works on astronomy.

- Handbook of Astrophysics
- Nebulae and Galaxies
- Solar Research
- Stars and Planets
- The Exploration of the Universe
- The History of Astronomy (1952, English edition)
- The Sun (1957)
