= Collurania-Teramo Observatory =

Observatory in Teramo, Italy

Abruzzo Astronomical Observatory
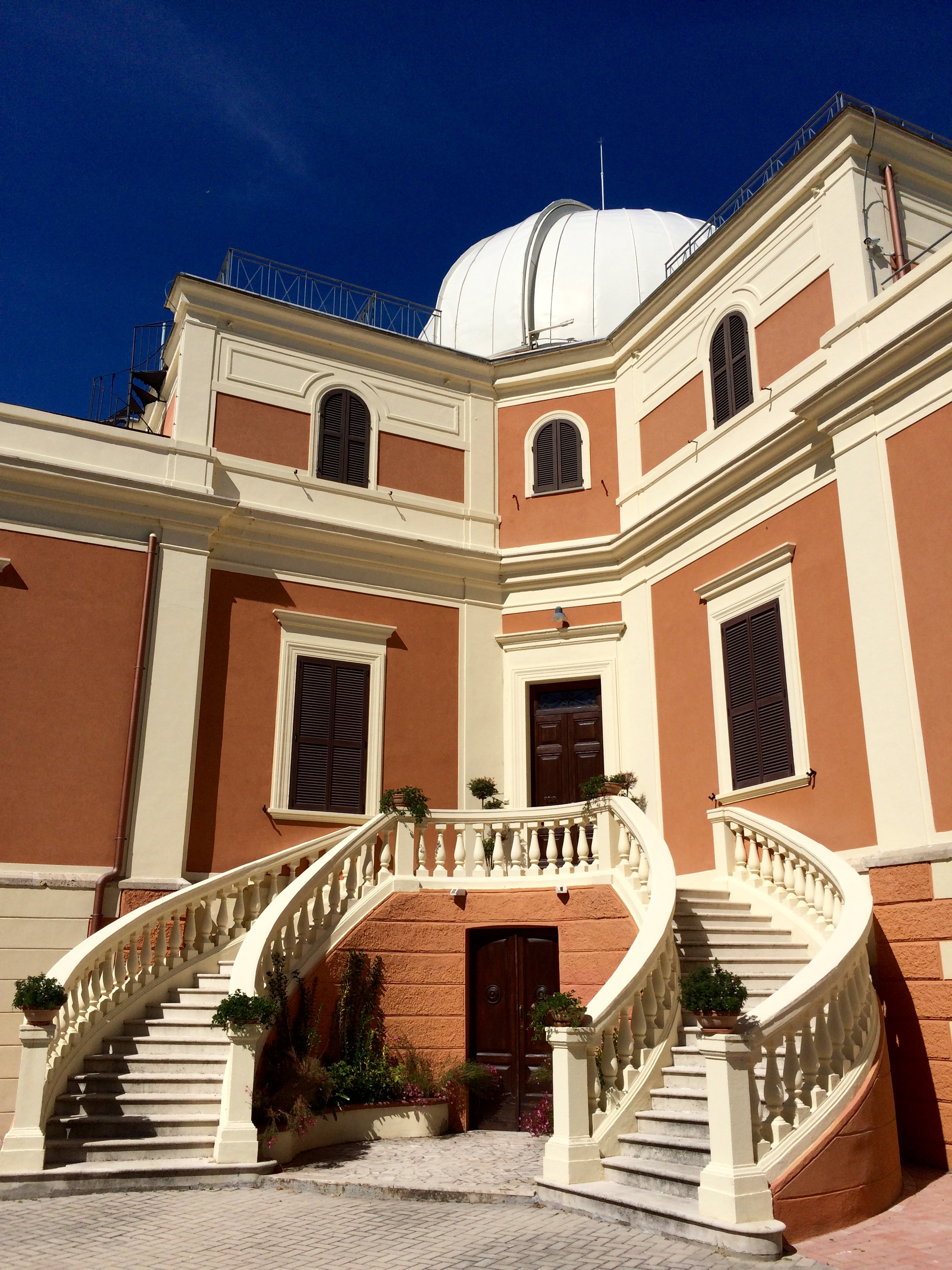
- Alternative names: Collurania-Teramo Observatory
- Organization: National Institute for Astrophysics
- Observatory code: 037
- Location: Teramo, Italy
- Coordinates: 42°39′18″N 13°43′49″E
- Website: www.oa-teramo.inaf.it
- Telescopes: Campo Imperatore Astronomical Observatory
- Related media on Commons

The Collurania Observatory, also Teramo Observatory, (Italian: Osservatorio Astronomico di Collurania "Vincenzo Cerulli"), is an astronomical observatory located in Teramo, in Abruzzo region of central Italy. It was founded by Vincenzo Cerulli in 1890, who was later honoured by having it bear his name. The observatory is owned and operated by the National Institute for Astrophysics (INAF). It has the IAU code 037.

== See also ==
- List of astronomical observatories
