= Villa Il Gioiello =

Building in Florence, Italy

Coordinates: 43°44′51.25″N 11°15′27.23″E

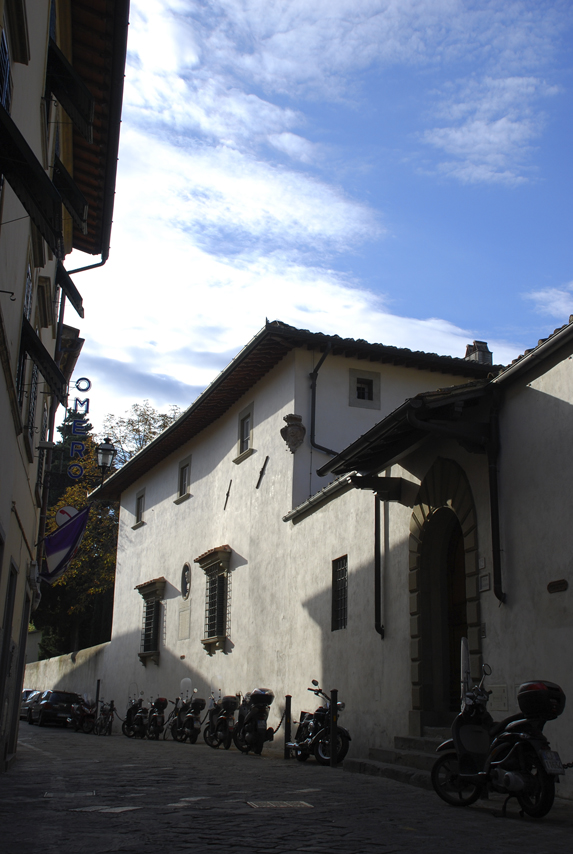
Villa Il Gioiello.

Villa il Gioiello ("The Jewel") is a villa in Florence, central Italy, famous for being one of the residences of Galileo Galilei, which he lived in from 1631 until his death in 1642. It is also known as Villa Galileo (not to be confused with the other homes of Galileo found in Florence, which are in Costa San Giorgio, as well as a villa in Bellosguardo).

== History ==
=== Origins ===
The name Gioiello was given due to its favorable position in the hills of Arcetri, near the Torre del Gallo. It was an elegant home, surrounded by many acres of farmland with a separate house for workers. It is recorded in the cadastre of 1427 to have been owned by Tommaso di Cristofano Masi and his brothers, who later passed it on to the Calderini family in 1525, where it is first mentioned as "The Jewel". The villa and its estate suffered damages during the siege of Florence in the years 1529 and 1530, whilst the entire area of Arcetri and Pian dei Giullari were occupied by Imperial troops. Calderini I sold it shortly thereafter to the Cavalcanti family, who rebuilt the home with its original simple lines, preserving its elegant look to the present day.

=== Galileo ===
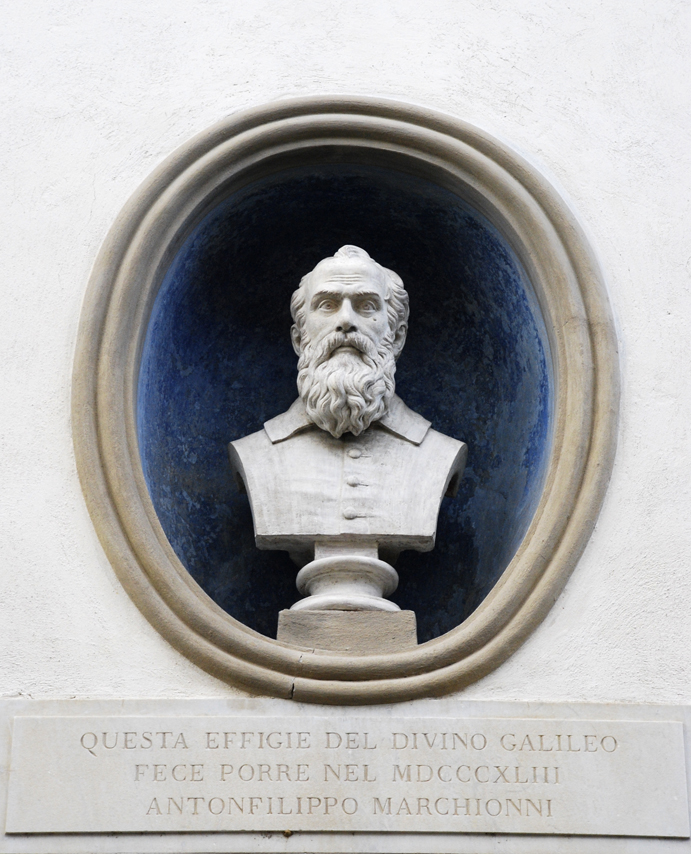
Bust of Galileo.

This rented residence with its fields, adjoined the monastery where his daughter, Sister Maria Celeste (born Virginia) was a nun. There are 124 remaining letters from Celeste to Galileo (the replies of the scientist were probably destroyed) which were filed after his death (at the State Archive of Florence) in the inventory of property owned by Galileo. Galileo's books are now held in the Biblioteca Nazionale Centrale di Firenze and are the subject of a celebratory exhibit: Galileiana 2009.

Galileo lived there from 1631; in 1633 the inquisition sentenced him to lifelong house arrest which he served in Il Gioiello from early 1634. Despite becoming blind in 1638, he continued to write some of his most significant works. In 1634 he suffered the loss of his favorite daughter, Celeste, but continued to work on Discourses and Mathematical Demonstrations Relating to Two New Sciences (Discorsi e Dimostrazioni Matematiche, intorno a due nuove scienze), in which he presented his theories on the strength and resistance of materials and on motion.

Shortly after Galileo moved to Arcetri, he received visits from Ferdinando II de' Medici as well as the painter Giusto Sustermans, who painted a portrait of the scientist. Other guests were the Ambassador of the Netherlands (Galileo had printed many of his books in Leiden) and the English poet John Milton. He made frequent visits to the students of Villa Castelli, and the young Vincenzo Viviani and Evangelista Torricelli assisted Galileo until his death.

=== Modern and contemporary times ===
In the centuries thereafter, the house has had various owners: the Del Soldato Family, whose coat of arms is on the façade, and even the nuns of St. Matthew, for which the "Signori Otto" (an ancient Florentine magistracy) adorned a plaque on the façade prohibiting “any card or ball game, ruzzola, or any other kind of game" with severe penalties if caught. In 1788 Senator Clemente Nelli had affixed a plaque dedicated to Galileo on the façade, and in 1843 a bust of the scientist was placed in a niche by the owners. In the 19th century, the building underwent further changes, especially on the upper floor.

Villa il Goiello has been a national monument since 1920 and was in private hands until 1942, when it was purchased by the state. It underwent a long restoration from 1986 to 2008, and today it is used for scientific workshops by the Osservatorio Astrofisico di Arcetri and the University of Florence. Visits are possible and are managed by the Museo di Storia Naturale di Firenze.

== Architecture ==
The villa is in the form of a "U", which encompasses the central courtyard, enclosed by a wall on the street side, facing the farmhouse. The courtyard has a loggia, supported by arch-less Tuscan columns. The façade on the street is very simple, with some rectangular windows with stone frames. Here you will find the bust of the astronomer, with an inscription of 1843, and another plaque, placed in 1942.

== Bibliography ==
- Giovanni Spadolini, La mia Firenze, frammenti dell'età favolosa, Firenze, Le Monnier, 1995
- Quella "casa chiusa" di Galileo, articolo sul Corriere Fiorentino, 23 dicembre 2008, pag. 12.
- Bettino Gerini, Vivere Firenze... Il Quartiere 3, Aster Italia, Firenze 2005.
