= Arcetri Observatory =

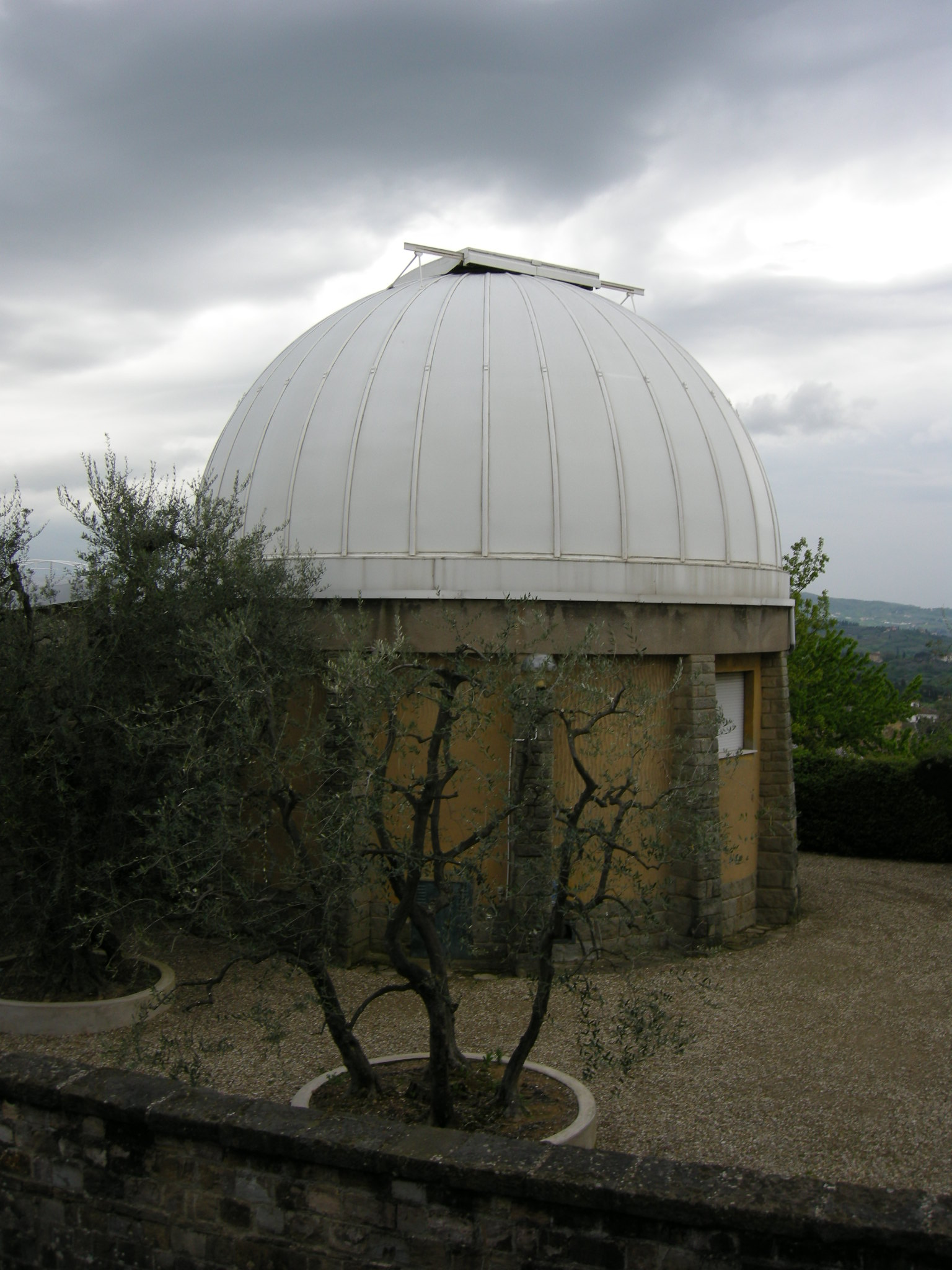
- Observatory code: 030
- Location: Arcetri, Florence, Metropolitan City of Florence, Tuscany, Italy
- Coordinates: 43°45′02″N 11°15′16″E
- Website: www.arcetri.inaf.it
- Related media on Commons

The Arcetri Observatory (Italian: Osservatorio Astrofisico di Arcetri) is an astrophysical observatory located in the hilly area of Arcetri on the outskirts of Florence, Italy. It is located close to Villa Il Gioiello, the residence of Galileo Galilei from 1631 to 1642.

Observatory staff carry out theoretical and observational astronomy as well as designing and constructing astronomical instrumentation. The observatory has been heavily involved with the following instrumentation projects:

- The MMT 6.5 m telescope
- The LBT 2 × 8.4 m telescopes
- The Telescopio Nazionale Galileo 3.5 m telescope
- The VLT adaptive secondary mirror
- The 1.5 m Gornergrat Infrared Telescope (TIRGO)

== See also ==
- List of solar telescopes
