= List of minor planets: 834001–835000 =

The following is a partial list of minor planets, running from minor-planet number 834001 through 835000, inclusive. The primary data for this and other partial lists is based on JPL's "Small-Body Orbital Elements" and data available from the Minor Planet Center. Critical list information is also provided by the MPC, unless otherwise specified from Lowell Observatory. A detailed description of the table's columns and additional sources are given on the main page including a complete list of every page in this series, and a statistical break-up on the dynamical classification of minor planets.

Also see the summary list of all named bodies in numerical and alphabetical order, and the corresponding naming citations for the number range of this particular list. New namings may only be added to this list after official publication, as the preannouncement of names is condemned by the Working Group for Small Bodies Nomenclature of the International Astronomical Union.

Near-Earth obj.	MBA (inner)	MBA (outer)	Centaur
Mars-crosser	MBA (middle)	Jupiter trojan	Trans-Neptunian obj.
Unclassified

== 834001–834100 ==
Designation			Discovery			Properties		Ref
Permanent	Provisional	Named after	Date	Site	Discoverer(s)	Category	Diam.	Ref
834001	2010 MP_{52}	—	June 16, 2010	WISE	WISE	EUP	2.8 km	MPC · JPL
834002	2010 MG_{53}	—	June 16, 2010	WISE	WISE	T_{j} (2.98)	2.5 km	MPC · JPL
834003	2010 MM_{53}	—	June 16, 2010	WISE	WISE	·	2.7 km	MPC · JPL
834004	2010 MC_{54}	—	March 18, 2018	Haleakala	Pan-STARRS 1	·	2.9 km	MPC · JPL
834005	2010 MN_{54}	—	June 16, 2010	WISE	WISE	·	2.5 km	MPC · JPL
834006	2010 MV_{54}	—	January 20, 2015	Haleakala	Pan-STARRS 1	·	3.2 km	MPC · JPL
834007	2010 MA_{55}	—	June 16, 2010	WISE	WISE	LIX	2.7 km	MPC · JPL
834008	2010 MD_{55}	—	June 16, 2010	WISE	WISE	·	4.0 km	MPC · JPL
834009	2010 MB_{57}	—	June 24, 2010	WISE	WISE	·	3.3 km	MPC · JPL
834010	2010 MN_{57}	—	April 12, 2010	Mount Lemmon	Mount Lemmon Survey	·	4.4 km	MPC · JPL
834011	2010 MA_{58}	—	June 24, 2010	WISE	WISE	·	2.6 km	MPC · JPL
834012	2010 MZ_{58}	—	June 24, 2010	WISE	WISE	·	2.8 km	MPC · JPL
834013	2010 MC_{59}	—	June 24, 2010	WISE	WISE	·	900 m	MPC · JPL
834014	2010 MQ_{59}	—	June 24, 2010	WISE	WISE	(69559)	3.1 km	MPC · JPL
834015	2010 MY_{59}	—	June 24, 2010	WISE	WISE	·	2.6 km	MPC · JPL
834016	2010 MZ_{59}	—	June 24, 2010	WISE	WISE	·	2.7 km	MPC · JPL
834017	2010 MH_{60}	—	June 24, 2010	WISE	WISE	AEO	1.7 km	MPC · JPL
834018	2010 MV_{60}	—	April 6, 2010	Catalina	CSS	THB	3.9 km	MPC · JPL
834019	2010 MQ_{61}	—	June 24, 2010	WISE	WISE	·	3.4 km	MPC · JPL
834020	2010 MU_{61}	—	September 5, 2007	Mount Lemmon	Mount Lemmon Survey	·	2.5 km	MPC · JPL
834021	2010 MH_{62}	—	June 24, 2010	WISE	WISE	·	1.9 km	MPC · JPL
834022	2010 MT_{62}	—	June 24, 2010	WISE	WISE	URS	2.8 km	MPC · JPL
834023	2010 MQ_{63}	—	June 24, 2010	WISE	WISE	·	1.8 km	MPC · JPL
834024	2010 MQ_{64}	—	April 2, 2009	Kitt Peak	Spacewatch	THB	2.5 km	MPC · JPL
834025	2010 MW_{64}	—	June 24, 2010	WISE	WISE	·	2.6 km	MPC · JPL
834026	2010 ML_{65}	—	June 25, 2010	WISE	WISE	·	2.5 km	MPC · JPL
834027	2010 MU_{65}	—	March 12, 2010	Kitt Peak	Spacewatch	DOR	1.8 km	MPC · JPL
834028	2010 MS_{66}	—	November 6, 2008	Kitt Peak	Spacewatch	LIX	2.6 km	MPC · JPL
834029	2010 MK_{67}	—	June 25, 2010	WISE	WISE	·	2.4 km	MPC · JPL
834030	2010 MM_{67}	—	May 5, 2010	Mount Lemmon	Mount Lemmon Survey	·	3.6 km	MPC · JPL
834031	2010 MW_{67}	—	June 25, 2010	WISE	WISE	·	2.9 km	MPC · JPL
834032	2010 MY_{67}	—	June 25, 2010	WISE	WISE	EOS	2.5 km	MPC · JPL
834033	2010 MT_{68}	—	February 20, 2001	Socorro	LINEAR	·	1.2 km	MPC · JPL
834034	2010 MA_{69}	—	June 25, 2010	WISE	WISE	EUP	2.4 km	MPC · JPL
834035	2010 MQ_{69}	—	June 25, 2010	WISE	WISE	·	2.6 km	MPC · JPL
834036	2010 MT_{69}	—	June 25, 2010	WISE	WISE	T_{j} (2.93) · 3:2	4.3 km	MPC · JPL
834037	2010 MZ_{72}	—	June 25, 2010	WISE	WISE	·	2.0 km	MPC · JPL
834038	2010 MA_{73}	—	June 25, 2010	WISE	WISE	·	1.9 km	MPC · JPL
834039	2010 MR_{73}	—	June 26, 2010	WISE	WISE	ADE	1.4 km	MPC · JPL
834040	2010 MT_{73}	—	June 26, 2010	WISE	WISE	·	1.7 km	MPC · JPL
834041	2010 MX_{74}	—	June 26, 2010	WISE	WISE	·	2.3 km	MPC · JPL
834042	2010 MF_{75}	—	April 12, 2010	Mount Lemmon	Mount Lemmon Survey	·	1.7 km	MPC · JPL
834043	2010 MN_{75}	—	June 26, 2010	WISE	WISE	LUT	4.8 km	MPC · JPL
834044	2010 MM_{76}	—	May 2, 2006	Mount Lemmon	Mount Lemmon Survey	·	1.1 km	MPC · JPL
834045	2010 MX_{76}	—	January 12, 2010	WISE	WISE	·	3.7 km	MPC · JPL
834046	2010 MY_{76}	—	June 26, 2010	WISE	WISE	·	620 m	MPC · JPL
834047	2010 MK_{77}	—	November 25, 2005	Catalina	CSS	T_{j} (2.98)	2.8 km	MPC · JPL
834048	2010 MR_{77}	—	June 26, 2010	WISE	WISE	·	3.1 km	MPC · JPL
834049	2010 MU_{77}	—	June 26, 2010	WISE	WISE	·	2.9 km	MPC · JPL
834050	2010 MZ_{77}	—	June 26, 2010	WISE	WISE	·	3.6 km	MPC · JPL
834051	2010 MH_{79}	—	December 22, 2008	Kitt Peak	Spacewatch	·	3.0 km	MPC · JPL
834052	2010 MJ_{79}	—	June 26, 2010	WISE	WISE	·	860 m	MPC · JPL
834053	2010 MR_{79}	—	June 26, 2010	WISE	WISE	·	1.6 km	MPC · JPL
834054	2010 MW_{79}	—	June 26, 2010	WISE	WISE	·	1.9 km	MPC · JPL
834055	2010 MZ_{79}	—	June 26, 2010	WISE	WISE	·	1.8 km	MPC · JPL
834056	2010 ML_{80}	—	June 26, 2010	WISE	WISE	·	2.9 km	MPC · JPL
834057	2010 MV_{81}	—	June 27, 2010	WISE	WISE	·	2.4 km	MPC · JPL
834058	2010 MZ_{81}	—	June 27, 2010	WISE	WISE	·	1.3 km	MPC · JPL
834059	2010 MG_{82}	—	March 15, 2010	Kitt Peak	Spacewatch	·	1.4 km	MPC · JPL
834060	2010 MT_{83}	—	June 27, 2010	WISE	WISE	·	2.3 km	MPC · JPL
834061	2010 MK_{84}	—	June 27, 2010	WISE	WISE	·	2.7 km	MPC · JPL
834062	2010 MN_{84}	—	June 27, 2010	WISE	WISE	·	2.4 km	MPC · JPL
834063	2010 MB_{85}	—	June 27, 2010	WISE	WISE	·	1.9 km	MPC · JPL
834064	2010 ME_{85}	—	June 27, 2010	WISE	WISE	·	1.8 km	MPC · JPL
834065	2010 MQ_{85}	—	June 27, 2010	WISE	WISE	EUN	1.9 km	MPC · JPL
834066	2010 MS_{86}	—	June 27, 2010	WISE	WISE	·	2.9 km	MPC · JPL
834067	2010 MT_{86}	—	June 27, 2010	WISE	WISE	·	2.6 km	MPC · JPL
834068	2010 MV_{86}	—	June 27, 2010	WISE	WISE	·	2.4 km	MPC · JPL
834069	2010 MO_{87}	—	June 27, 2010	WISE	WISE	·	2.5 km	MPC · JPL
834070	2010 MB_{88}	—	June 29, 2010	WISE	WISE	·	1.3 km	MPC · JPL
834071	2010 MA_{89}	—	June 27, 2010	WISE	WISE	·	3.3 km	MPC · JPL
834072	2010 MF_{89}	—	June 27, 2010	WISE	WISE	·	2.4 km	MPC · JPL
834073	2010 MJ_{89}	—	June 27, 2010	WISE	WISE	·	1.6 km	MPC · JPL
834074	2010 MO_{89}	—	April 12, 2010	Mount Lemmon	Mount Lemmon Survey	·	1.9 km	MPC · JPL
834075	2010 MC_{90}	—	June 27, 2010	WISE	WISE	·	1.6 km	MPC · JPL
834076	2010 MO_{90}	—	June 27, 2010	WISE	WISE	·	3.3 km	MPC · JPL
834077	2010 MU_{90}	—	June 27, 2010	WISE	WISE	LIX	2.7 km	MPC · JPL
834078	2010 MV_{90}	—	January 17, 2005	Kitt Peak	Spacewatch	DOR	1.9 km	MPC · JPL
834079	2010 MF_{91}	—	June 28, 2010	WISE	WISE	·	3.3 km	MPC · JPL
834080	2010 MR_{91}	—	June 28, 2010	WISE	WISE	LIX	4.0 km	MPC · JPL
834081	2010 MD_{92}	—	June 28, 2010	WISE	WISE	·	2.2 km	MPC · JPL
834082	2010 MF_{92}	—	June 28, 2010	WISE	WISE	EUP	2.1 km	MPC · JPL
834083	2010 MH_{92}	—	June 28, 2010	WISE	WISE	·	2.3 km	MPC · JPL
834084	2010 MJ_{92}	—	June 28, 2010	WISE	WISE	·	3.5 km	MPC · JPL
834085	2010 MV_{92}	—	June 28, 2010	WISE	WISE	·	2.8 km	MPC · JPL
834086	2010 ME_{93}	—	June 28, 2010	WISE	WISE	ELF	2.9 km	MPC · JPL
834087	2010 MJ_{93}	—	June 28, 2010	WISE	WISE	T_{j} (2.99) · 3:2	4.1 km	MPC · JPL
834088	2010 MW_{93}	—	June 28, 2010	WISE	WISE	·	2.7 km	MPC · JPL
834089	2010 MG_{94}	—	June 28, 2010	WISE	WISE	LIX	2.4 km	MPC · JPL
834090	2010 MN_{94}	—	June 28, 2010	WISE	WISE	·	3.7 km	MPC · JPL
834091	2010 MV_{94}	—	November 7, 2008	Mount Lemmon	Mount Lemmon Survey	·	2.4 km	MPC · JPL
834092	2010 MW_{94}	—	June 28, 2010	WISE	WISE	·	1.3 km	MPC · JPL
834093	2010 MX_{94}	—	June 28, 2010	WISE	WISE	·	3.5 km	MPC · JPL
834094	2010 MK_{95}	—	October 17, 2001	Palomar	NEAT	·	1.9 km	MPC · JPL
834095	2010 MS_{95}	—	April 19, 2009	Kitt Peak	Spacewatch	·	1.7 km	MPC · JPL
834096	2010 ME_{97}	—	June 28, 2010	WISE	WISE	TIR	2.3 km	MPC · JPL
834097	2010 MF_{97}	—	June 28, 2010	WISE	WISE	·	2.3 km	MPC · JPL
834098	2010 MW_{97}	—	June 28, 2010	WISE	WISE	EUN	820 m	MPC · JPL
834099	2010 MH_{98}	—	June 28, 2010	WISE	WISE	·	2.3 km	MPC · JPL
834100	2010 MG_{99}	—	June 29, 2010	WISE	WISE	·	1.9 km	MPC · JPL

== 834101–834200 ==
back to top

Designation			Discovery			Properties		Ref
Permanent	Provisional	Named after	Date	Site	Discoverer(s)	Category	Diam.	Ref
834101	2010 MR_{99}	—	April 14, 2010	Mount Lemmon	Mount Lemmon Survey	LIX	3.7 km	MPC · JPL
834102	2010 MV_{99}	—	June 29, 2010	WISE	WISE	·	2.8 km	MPC · JPL
834103	2010 MR_{100}	—	April 10, 2010	Mount Lemmon	Mount Lemmon Survey	·	1.3 km	MPC · JPL
834104	2010 MS_{100}	—	April 15, 2010	Mount Lemmon	Mount Lemmon Survey	·	1.9 km	MPC · JPL
834105	2010 MN_{102}	—	April 30, 2009	Kitt Peak	Spacewatch	·	2.4 km	MPC · JPL
834106	2010 MW_{104}	—	June 29, 2010	WISE	WISE	·	1.9 km	MPC · JPL
834107	2010 MG_{105}	—	February 16, 2017	Haleakala	Pan-STARRS 1	·	1.5 km	MPC · JPL
834108	2010 MH_{105}	—	April 10, 2010	Mount Lemmon	Mount Lemmon Survey	·	1.4 km	MPC · JPL
834109	2010 MO_{105}	—	June 30, 2010	WISE	WISE	ADE	1.9 km	MPC · JPL
834110	2010 MP_{106}	—	June 30, 2010	WISE	WISE	·	2.2 km	MPC · JPL
834111	2010 MY_{106}	—	November 19, 2006	Catalina	CSS	·	1.2 km	MPC · JPL
834112	2010 MN_{107}	—	June 30, 2010	WISE	WISE	(895)	2.6 km	MPC · JPL
834113	2010 MO_{107}	—	June 30, 2010	WISE	WISE	·	1.8 km	MPC · JPL
834114	2010 MQ_{108}	—	June 30, 2010	WISE	WISE	·	3.0 km	MPC · JPL
834115	2010 MH_{109}	—	June 30, 2010	WISE	WISE	·	2.0 km	MPC · JPL
834116	2010 MN_{109}	—	July 5, 2010	WISE	WISE	·	1.1 km	MPC · JPL
834117	2010 MO_{109}	—	June 30, 2010	WISE	WISE	·	2.4 km	MPC · JPL
834118	2010 MG_{110}	—	June 30, 2010	WISE	WISE	·	1.7 km	MPC · JPL
834119	2010 MF_{138}	—	June 27, 2010	WISE	WISE	NAE	1.7 km	MPC · JPL
834120	2010 MS_{138}	—	March 19, 2015	Haleakala	Pan-STARRS 1	·	1.8 km	MPC · JPL
834121	2010 MW_{148}	—	February 21, 2010	WISE	WISE	·	850 m	MPC · JPL
834122	2010 MF_{149}	—	April 24, 2010	WISE	WISE	L5	10 km	MPC · JPL
834123	2010 MY_{149}	—	June 21, 2010	Mount Lemmon	Mount Lemmon Survey	·	1.3 km	MPC · JPL
834124	2010 MH_{150}	—	June 17, 2010	Mount Lemmon	Mount Lemmon Survey	·	780 m	MPC · JPL
834125	2010 NB_{1}	—	July 5, 2010	San Pedro de Atacama	I. de la Cueva	·	960 m	MPC · JPL
834126	2010 NN_{7}	—	March 14, 2010	Kitt Peak	Spacewatch	·	2.0 km	MPC · JPL
834127	2010 ND_{8}	—	April 20, 2010	Mount Lemmon	Mount Lemmon Survey	·	2.4 km	MPC · JPL
834128	2010 NM_{8}	—	April 7, 2010	Catalina	CSS	·	1.8 km	MPC · JPL
834129	2010 NC_{9}	—	July 4, 2010	WISE	WISE	·	540 m	MPC · JPL
834130	2010 NU_{9}	—	October 4, 2006	Mount Lemmon	Mount Lemmon Survey	·	1.2 km	MPC · JPL
834131	2010 NY_{10}	—	July 5, 2010	WISE	WISE	·	1.2 km	MPC · JPL
834132	2010 NH_{11}	—	July 5, 2010	WISE	WISE	·	3.4 km	MPC · JPL
834133	2010 NU_{11}	—	July 5, 2010	WISE	WISE	3:2 · SHU	4.4 km	MPC · JPL
834134	2010 ND_{12}	—	July 5, 2010	WISE	WISE	LUT	4.7 km	MPC · JPL
834135	2010 NW_{14}	—	July 5, 2010	WISE	WISE	·	1.4 km	MPC · JPL
834136	2010 NL_{15}	—	July 5, 2010	WISE	WISE	T_{j} (2.98) · EUP	2.9 km	MPC · JPL
834137	2010 NJ_{16}	—	July 6, 2010	WISE	WISE	T_{j} (2.98)	3.5 km	MPC · JPL
834138	2010 NN_{16}	—	April 13, 2010	Catalina	CSS	·	1.7 km	MPC · JPL
834139	2010 NV_{16}	—	July 6, 2010	WISE	WISE	(5651)	2.4 km	MPC · JPL
834140	2010 NR_{18}	—	July 6, 2010	WISE	WISE	·	3.9 km	MPC · JPL
834141	2010 NR_{19}	—	July 6, 2010	WISE	WISE	·	3.5 km	MPC · JPL
834142	2010 NA_{20}	—	July 6, 2010	WISE	WISE	·	2.3 km	MPC · JPL
834143	2010 NG_{20}	—	July 6, 2010	WISE	WISE	·	2.5 km	MPC · JPL
834144	2010 NL_{20}	—	October 2, 2006	Kitt Peak	Spacewatch	·	1.2 km	MPC · JPL
834145	2010 NZ_{20}	—	September 19, 2007	Kitt Peak	Spacewatch	·	1.8 km	MPC · JPL
834146	2010 NR_{21}	—	July 6, 2010	WISE	WISE	T_{j} (2.99) · 3:2	3.8 km	MPC · JPL
834147	2010 NF_{22}	—	July 6, 2010	WISE	WISE	·	3.4 km	MPC · JPL
834148	2010 NY_{22}	—	July 6, 2010	WISE	WISE	·	3.1 km	MPC · JPL
834149	2010 NP_{23}	—	December 7, 2013	Haleakala	Pan-STARRS 1	·	3.5 km	MPC · JPL
834150	2010 NQ_{23}	—	July 6, 2010	WISE	WISE	·	2.7 km	MPC · JPL
834151	2010 NK_{24}	—	July 7, 2010	WISE	WISE	THB	2.5 km	MPC · JPL
834152	2010 NQ_{24}	—	July 7, 2010	WISE	WISE	DOR	2.2 km	MPC · JPL
834153	2010 NT_{24}	—	July 7, 2010	WISE	WISE	·	2.8 km	MPC · JPL
834154	2010 NF_{26}	—	July 7, 2010	WISE	WISE	DOR	1.8 km	MPC · JPL
834155	2010 NK_{26}	—	July 7, 2010	WISE	WISE	·	3.9 km	MPC · JPL
834156	2010 NR_{26}	—	July 7, 2010	WISE	WISE	·	3.2 km	MPC · JPL
834157	2010 NU_{26}	—	July 7, 2010	WISE	WISE	·	990 m	MPC · JPL
834158	2010 NO_{27}	—	July 7, 2010	WISE	WISE	T_{j} (2.98) · 3:2	4.6 km	MPC · JPL
834159	2010 NW_{27}	—	July 7, 2010	WISE	WISE	·	2.3 km	MPC · JPL
834160	2010 NZ_{27}	—	July 7, 2010	WISE	WISE	·	3.2 km	MPC · JPL
834161	2010 NR_{28}	—	July 25, 2015	Haleakala	Pan-STARRS 1	·	3.0 km	MPC · JPL
834162	2010 NG_{29}	—	July 7, 2010	WISE	WISE	·	2.2 km	MPC · JPL
834163	2010 NM_{29}	—	July 7, 2010	WISE	WISE	·	2.6 km	MPC · JPL
834164	2010 NN_{29}	—	July 7, 2010	WISE	WISE	·	2.4 km	MPC · JPL
834165	2010 NQ_{29}	—	July 7, 2010	WISE	WISE	T_{j} (2.99)	3.5 km	MPC · JPL
834166	2010 NF_{30}	—	September 17, 2006	Kitt Peak	Spacewatch	·	1.1 km	MPC · JPL
834167	2010 NS_{31}	—	July 8, 2005	Kitt Peak	Spacewatch	·	2.9 km	MPC · JPL
834168	2010 NV_{32}	—	July 7, 2010	WISE	WISE	·	3.0 km	MPC · JPL
834169	2010 ND_{33}	—	July 7, 2010	WISE	WISE	·	2.2 km	MPC · JPL
834170	2010 NS_{33}	—	July 7, 2010	WISE	WISE	·	2.4 km	MPC · JPL
834171	2010 NE_{34}	—	July 6, 2010	Kitt Peak	Spacewatch	·	1.6 km	MPC · JPL
834172	2010 NC_{35}	—	July 8, 2010	WISE	WISE	ADE	2.2 km	MPC · JPL
834173	2010 NE_{35}	—	July 8, 2010	WISE	WISE	·	2.0 km	MPC · JPL
834174	2010 NB_{36}	—	July 7, 2010	Kitt Peak	Spacewatch	·	3.4 km	MPC · JPL
834175	2010 NE_{36}	—	July 8, 2010	WISE	WISE	·	1.5 km	MPC · JPL
834176	2010 NL_{37}	—	February 13, 2004	Kitt Peak	Spacewatch	·	2.5 km	MPC · JPL
834177	2010 NR_{37}	—	July 8, 2010	WISE	WISE	·	2.8 km	MPC · JPL
834178	2010 NY_{37}	—	July 8, 2010	WISE	WISE	EUP	3.1 km	MPC · JPL
834179	2010 NA_{38}	—	July 8, 2010	WISE	WISE	·	2.2 km	MPC · JPL
834180	2010 NT_{38}	—	July 9, 2010	WISE	WISE	·	1.7 km	MPC · JPL
834181	2010 NA_{39}	—	July 8, 2010	WISE	WISE	·	3.4 km	MPC · JPL
834182	2010 NP_{39}	—	April 12, 2010	Mount Lemmon	Mount Lemmon Survey	LIX	2.3 km	MPC · JPL
834183	2010 NV_{39}	—	July 8, 2010	WISE	WISE	·	2.1 km	MPC · JPL
834184	2010 NX_{40}	—	July 8, 2010	WISE	WISE	·	4.0 km	MPC · JPL
834185	2010 NB_{41}	—	July 8, 2010	WISE	WISE	AST	2.0 km	MPC · JPL
834186	2010 NM_{41}	—	July 8, 2010	WISE	WISE	T_{j} (2.98) · 3:2	4.1 km	MPC · JPL
834187	2010 NJ_{44}	—	July 9, 2010	WISE	WISE	·	1.6 km	MPC · JPL
834188	2010 NU_{44}	—	October 4, 2002	Sacramento Peak	SDSS	·	3.3 km	MPC · JPL
834189	2010 NY_{44}	—	July 9, 2010	WISE	WISE	·	2.1 km	MPC · JPL
834190	2010 NF_{45}	—	August 9, 2005	Cerro Tololo	Deep Ecliptic Survey	·	2.0 km	MPC · JPL
834191	2010 NM_{45}	—	December 21, 2006	Kitt Peak	Spacewatch	·	1.8 km	MPC · JPL
834192	2010 NW_{47}	—	July 9, 2010	WISE	WISE	PHO	1.9 km	MPC · JPL
834193	2010 NL_{48}	—	July 9, 2010	WISE	WISE	·	1.9 km	MPC · JPL
834194	2010 NP_{49}	—	July 9, 2010	WISE	WISE	·	3.0 km	MPC · JPL
834195	2010 NN_{50}	—	July 9, 2010	WISE	WISE	·	2.6 km	MPC · JPL
834196	2010 NY_{50}	—	July 9, 2010	WISE	WISE	EOS	2.2 km	MPC · JPL
834197	2010 ND_{51}	—	July 10, 2010	WISE	WISE	·	3.5 km	MPC · JPL
834198	2010 NQ_{52}	—	July 10, 2010	WISE	WISE	·	2.1 km	MPC · JPL
834199	2010 NK_{54}	—	July 10, 2010	WISE	WISE	·	2.8 km	MPC · JPL
834200	2010 NO_{54}	—	July 10, 2010	WISE	WISE	·	2.8 km	MPC · JPL

== 834201–834300 ==
back to top

Designation			Discovery			Properties		Ref
Permanent	Provisional	Named after	Date	Site	Discoverer(s)	Category	Diam.	Ref
834201	2010 NB_{55}	—	July 10, 2010	WISE	WISE	·	2.2 km	MPC · JPL
834202	2010 NM_{56}	—	December 21, 2006	Kitt Peak	Spacewatch	·	1.8 km	MPC · JPL
834203	2010 NH_{57}	—	July 10, 2010	WISE	WISE	·	1.6 km	MPC · JPL
834204	2010 NN_{57}	—	July 10, 2010	WISE	WISE	·	880 m	MPC · JPL
834205	2010 NU_{57}	—	July 10, 2010	WISE	WISE	3:2	4.3 km	MPC · JPL
834206	2010 NY_{59}	—	July 11, 2010	WISE	WISE	·	2.1 km	MPC · JPL
834207	2010 ND_{61}	—	July 11, 2010	WISE	WISE	·	1.2 km	MPC · JPL
834208	2010 NU_{61}	—	April 14, 2010	Mount Lemmon	Mount Lemmon Survey	·	1.3 km	MPC · JPL
834209	2010 NL_{62}	—	January 20, 2010	WISE	WISE	·	2.9 km	MPC · JPL
834210	2010 NT_{62}	—	July 11, 2010	WISE	WISE	·	1.9 km	MPC · JPL
834211	2010 NT_{63}	—	December 21, 2008	Mount Lemmon	Mount Lemmon Survey	·	2.2 km	MPC · JPL
834212	2010 NB_{64}	—	July 11, 2010	WISE	WISE	·	1.9 km	MPC · JPL
834213	2010 NH_{65}	—	July 11, 2010	WISE	WISE	·	4.3 km	MPC · JPL
834214	2010 NO_{66}	—	July 14, 2010	WISE	WISE	·	2.8 km	MPC · JPL
834215	2010 NS_{66}	—	July 15, 2010	WISE	WISE	·	3.0 km	MPC · JPL
834216	2010 NE_{72}	—	July 14, 2010	WISE	WISE	PHO	670 m	MPC · JPL
834217	2010 NH_{72}	—	July 14, 2010	WISE	WISE	·	3.0 km	MPC · JPL
834218	2010 NJ_{72}	—	July 14, 2010	WISE	WISE	·	3.5 km	MPC · JPL
834219	2010 NX_{74}	—	July 15, 2010	WISE	WISE	·	3.2 km	MPC · JPL
834220	2010 NG_{76}	—	July 15, 2010	WISE	WISE	·	1.6 km	MPC · JPL
834221	2010 NL_{76}	—	October 13, 1999	Sacramento Peak	SDSS	URS	3.4 km	MPC · JPL
834222	2010 NO_{76}	—	July 15, 2010	WISE	WISE	·	2.4 km	MPC · JPL
834223	2010 NG_{77}	—	July 15, 2010	WISE	WISE	·	1.7 km	MPC · JPL
834224	2010 NM_{77}	—	July 15, 2010	WISE	WISE	·	3.2 km	MPC · JPL
834225	2010 NN_{80}	—	July 15, 2010	WISE	WISE	·	2.0 km	MPC · JPL
834226	2010 NS_{80}	—	July 15, 2010	WISE	WISE	·	3.5 km	MPC · JPL
834227	2010 NZ_{80}	—	July 15, 2010	WISE	WISE	·	2.2 km	MPC · JPL
834228	2010 NE_{81}	—	May 16, 2009	Mount Lemmon	Mount Lemmon Survey	KON	1.8 km	MPC · JPL
834229	2010 NS_{82}	—	July 1, 2010	WISE	WISE	·	2.4 km	MPC · JPL
834230	2010 NT_{83}	—	May 12, 2010	Mount Lemmon	Mount Lemmon Survey	·	550 m	MPC · JPL
834231	2010 NZ_{83}	—	May 7, 2005	Mount Lemmon	Mount Lemmon Survey	·	3.0 km	MPC · JPL
834232	2010 NJ_{84}	—	May 5, 2010	Catalina	CSS	·	1.8 km	MPC · JPL
834233	2010 NF_{85}	—	March 26, 2003	Kitt Peak	Spacewatch	·	2.0 km	MPC · JPL
834234	2010 NO_{87}	—	July 2, 2010	WISE	WISE	·	2.5 km	MPC · JPL
834235	2010 NY_{88}	—	July 2, 2010	WISE	WISE	·	2.1 km	MPC · JPL
834236	2010 NC_{89}	—	January 7, 2010	WISE	WISE	·	1.5 km	MPC · JPL
834237	2010 NS_{89}	—	July 2, 2010	WISE	WISE	·	3.9 km	MPC · JPL
834238	2010 NY_{89}	—	April 6, 2010	Catalina	CSS	·	2.6 km	MPC · JPL
834239	2010 NQ_{90}	—	January 12, 2010	WISE	WISE	·	2.2 km	MPC · JPL
834240	2010 ND_{91}	—	April 10, 2010	Mount Lemmon	Mount Lemmon Survey	·	2.0 km	MPC · JPL
834241	2010 NP_{91}	—	July 2, 2010	WISE	WISE	(194)	1.2 km	MPC · JPL
834242	2010 NN_{92}	—	July 2, 2010	WISE	WISE	·	2.0 km	MPC · JPL
834243	2010 NO_{92}	—	July 2, 2010	WISE	WISE	ERI	1.3 km	MPC · JPL
834244	2010 NN_{93}	—	July 3, 2010	WISE	WISE	·	720 m	MPC · JPL
834245	2010 NL_{94}	—	July 3, 2010	WISE	WISE	·	540 m	MPC · JPL
834246	2010 NM_{95}	—	September 3, 1999	Prescott	P. G. Comba	·	2.5 km	MPC · JPL
834247	2010 NA_{96}	—	July 4, 2010	WISE	WISE	VER	2.1 km	MPC · JPL
834248	2010 NL_{96}	—	February 4, 2006	Mount Lemmon	Mount Lemmon Survey	·	880 m	MPC · JPL
834249	2010 NS_{96}	—	April 15, 2010	Mount Lemmon	Mount Lemmon Survey	·	2.8 km	MPC · JPL
834250	2010 NW_{96}	—	July 11, 2010	WISE	WISE	(194)	2.4 km	MPC · JPL
834251	2010 NJ_{97}	—	July 11, 2010	WISE	WISE	T_{j} (2.96)	3.5 km	MPC · JPL
834252	2010 NT_{97}	—	July 11, 2010	WISE	WISE	T_{j} (2.99)	2.4 km	MPC · JPL
834253	2010 NX_{98}	—	July 12, 2010	WISE	WISE	·	2.0 km	MPC · JPL
834254	2010 NN_{100}	—	September 19, 2001	Socorro	LINEAR	·	1.7 km	MPC · JPL
834255	2010 NO_{100}	—	July 12, 2010	WISE	WISE	·	2.4 km	MPC · JPL
834256	2010 NX_{100}	—	July 12, 2010	WISE	WISE	ADE	2.5 km	MPC · JPL
834257	2010 NO_{101}	—	July 12, 2010	WISE	WISE	·	2.1 km	MPC · JPL
834258	2010 NK_{102}	—	July 12, 2010	WISE	WISE	ADE	2.0 km	MPC · JPL
834259	2010 NQ_{102}	—	July 12, 2010	WISE	WISE	·	2.2 km	MPC · JPL
834260	2010 NV_{102}	—	July 12, 2010	WISE	WISE	·	2.4 km	MPC · JPL
834261	2010 NC_{105}	—	September 1, 2005	Kitt Peak	Spacewatch	DOR	2.3 km	MPC · JPL
834262	2010 NS_{105}	—	July 12, 2010	WISE	WISE	·	2.2 km	MPC · JPL
834263	2010 NM_{106}	—	July 12, 2010	WISE	WISE	·	3.5 km	MPC · JPL
834264	2010 NZ_{106}	—	July 12, 2010	WISE	WISE	3:2	3.2 km	MPC · JPL
834265	2010 NE_{108}	—	July 13, 2010	WISE	WISE	DOR	1.4 km	MPC · JPL
834266	2010 NK_{108}	—	July 13, 2010	WISE	WISE	·	3.2 km	MPC · JPL
834267	2010 NH_{109}	—	July 13, 2010	WISE	WISE	·	2.4 km	MPC · JPL
834268	2010 NH_{110}	—	April 5, 2008	Mount Lemmon	Mount Lemmon Survey	·	2.3 km	MPC · JPL
834269	2010 NP_{110}	—	July 13, 2010	WISE	WISE	·	2.8 km	MPC · JPL
834270	2010 NR_{111}	—	November 12, 2007	Mount Lemmon	Mount Lemmon Survey	EOS	3.0 km	MPC · JPL
834271	2010 NY_{111}	—	July 13, 2010	WISE	WISE	·	2.4 km	MPC · JPL
834272	2010 NC_{112}	—	July 13, 2010	WISE	WISE	·	1.3 km	MPC · JPL
834273	2010 NX_{112}	—	January 18, 2010	WISE	WISE	·	2.2 km	MPC · JPL
834274	2010 NP_{113}	—	July 13, 2010	WISE	WISE	THM	2.7 km	MPC · JPL
834275	2010 NQ_{113}	—	September 19, 2001	Socorro	LINEAR	·	2.0 km	MPC · JPL
834276	2010 NT_{113}	—	January 21, 2010	WISE	WISE	·	1.6 km	MPC · JPL
834277	2010 NV_{113}	—	October 28, 2005	Kitt Peak	Spacewatch	·	3.1 km	MPC · JPL
834278	2010 NZ_{113}	—	July 13, 2010	WISE	WISE	3:2 · SHU	4.2 km	MPC · JPL
834279	2010 NC_{114}	—	July 13, 2010	WISE	WISE	·	3.4 km	MPC · JPL
834280	2010 NX_{114}	—	July 14, 2010	WISE	WISE	·	1.6 km	MPC · JPL
834281	2010 NA_{115}	—	July 14, 2010	WISE	WISE	·	4.0 km	MPC · JPL
834282	2010 NB_{115}	—	October 10, 2002	Sacramento Peak	SDSS	T_{j} (2.98) · 3:2 · SHU	5.5 km	MPC · JPL
834283	2010 NH_{115}	—	July 14, 2010	WISE	WISE	·	3.2 km	MPC · JPL
834284	2010 NT_{115}	—	January 26, 2010	WISE	WISE	·	2.4 km	MPC · JPL
834285	2010 NJ_{118}	—	July 11, 2010	WISE	WISE	·	1.5 km	MPC · JPL
834286	2010 NO_{118}	—	January 10, 2007	Mount Lemmon	Mount Lemmon Survey	·	3.1 km	MPC · JPL
834287	2010 NT_{146}	—	April 30, 2010	WISE	WISE	·	2.3 km	MPC · JPL
834288	2010 NX_{147}	—	May 2, 2010	WISE	WISE	·	1.5 km	MPC · JPL
834289	2010 NA_{148}	—	April 20, 2010	WISE	WISE	T_{j} (2.99)	2.6 km	MPC · JPL
834290	2010 NF_{148}	—	July 4, 2010	Mount Lemmon	Mount Lemmon Survey	ADE	1.4 km	MPC · JPL
834291	2010 OR	—	July 17, 2010	WISE	WISE	·	4.2 km	MPC · JPL
834292	2010 OS	—	July 17, 2010	WISE	WISE	·	4.8 km	MPC · JPL
834293	2010 OX_{1}	—	July 16, 2010	WISE	WISE	·	2.9 km	MPC · JPL
834294	2010 OY_{1}	—	July 16, 2010	WISE	WISE	T_{j} (2.98) · 3:2 · (6124)	3.8 km	MPC · JPL
834295	2010 OD_{2}	—	July 16, 2010	WISE	WISE	·	2.0 km	MPC · JPL
834296	2010 OG_{2}	—	July 16, 2010	WISE	WISE	ADE	1.9 km	MPC · JPL
834297	2010 OJ_{2}	—	July 16, 2010	WISE	WISE	·	2.0 km	MPC · JPL
834298	2010 OM_{2}	—	July 16, 2010	WISE	WISE	LUT	3.0 km	MPC · JPL
834299	2010 OR_{2}	—	April 10, 2010	Mount Lemmon	Mount Lemmon Survey	·	2.6 km	MPC · JPL
834300	2010 OY_{2}	—	October 8, 2012	Mount Lemmon	Mount Lemmon Survey	·	2.4 km	MPC · JPL

== 834301–834400 ==
back to top

Designation			Discovery			Properties		Ref
Permanent	Provisional	Named after	Date	Site	Discoverer(s)	Category	Diam.	Ref
834301	2010 OB_{3}	—	July 16, 2010	WISE	WISE	·	1.2 km	MPC · JPL
834302	2010 OL_{3}	—	July 16, 2010	WISE	WISE	·	2.9 km	MPC · JPL
834303	2010 OE_{5}	—	July 16, 2010	WISE	WISE	·	2.9 km	MPC · JPL
834304	2010 ON_{6}	—	July 16, 2010	WISE	WISE	EUP	3.2 km	MPC · JPL
834305	2010 OJ_{7}	—	July 16, 2010	WISE	WISE	·	1.2 km	MPC · JPL
834306	2010 OZ_{7}	—	January 27, 2010	WISE	WISE	·	3.3 km	MPC · JPL
834307	2010 OR_{8}	—	July 16, 2010	WISE	WISE	HYG	2.6 km	MPC · JPL
834308	2010 ON_{9}	—	July 16, 2010	WISE	WISE	3:2 · SHU	3.8 km	MPC · JPL
834309	2010 OC_{11}	—	January 27, 2010	WISE	WISE	·	4.1 km	MPC · JPL
834310	2010 OU_{11}	—	July 17, 2010	WISE	WISE	·	2.7 km	MPC · JPL
834311	2010 OV_{11}	—	July 17, 2010	WISE	WISE	·	3.5 km	MPC · JPL
834312	2010 OX_{11}	—	July 17, 2010	WISE	WISE	·	2.1 km	MPC · JPL
834313	2010 OA_{12}	—	July 17, 2010	WISE	WISE	·	3.6 km	MPC · JPL
834314	2010 ON_{12}	—	July 17, 2010	WISE	WISE	·	1.7 km	MPC · JPL
834315	2010 OO_{12}	—	July 17, 2010	WISE	WISE	·	3.3 km	MPC · JPL
834316	2010 OW_{12}	—	July 17, 2010	WISE	WISE	·	1.4 km	MPC · JPL
834317	2010 OE_{13}	—	July 17, 2010	WISE	WISE	·	1.5 km	MPC · JPL
834318	2010 OS_{13}	—	July 17, 2010	WISE	WISE	·	2.4 km	MPC · JPL
834319	2010 OA_{14}	—	July 17, 2010	WISE	WISE	·	1.7 km	MPC · JPL
834320	2010 OH_{14}	—	July 17, 2010	WISE	WISE	3:2	4.6 km	MPC · JPL
834321	2010 OQ_{14}	—	July 17, 2010	WISE	WISE	·	2.8 km	MPC · JPL
834322	2010 OT_{14}	—	July 17, 2010	WISE	WISE	T_{j} (2.98) · EUP	2.6 km	MPC · JPL
834323	2010 OD_{15}	—	January 13, 2002	Palomar	NEAT	·	1.6 km	MPC · JPL
834324	2010 OQ_{15}	—	July 17, 2010	WISE	WISE	EUP	4.1 km	MPC · JPL
834325	2010 OF_{16}	—	July 17, 2010	WISE	WISE	·	2.0 km	MPC · JPL
834326	2010 OP_{17}	—	July 17, 2010	WISE	WISE	·	1.7 km	MPC · JPL
834327	2010 OM_{18}	—	September 18, 2001	Anderson Mesa	LONEOS	·	2.4 km	MPC · JPL
834328	2010 OP_{18}	—	July 18, 2010	WISE	WISE	·	2.6 km	MPC · JPL
834329	2010 OU_{18}	—	July 18, 2010	WISE	WISE	(69559)	3.0 km	MPC · JPL
834330	2010 OH_{19}	—	July 18, 2010	WISE	WISE	·	3.8 km	MPC · JPL
834331	2010 OY_{19}	—	July 18, 2010	WISE	WISE	ADE	2.0 km	MPC · JPL
834332	2010 OG_{21}	—	March 31, 2009	Kitt Peak	Spacewatch	PHO	2.2 km	MPC · JPL
834333	2010 OH_{21}	—	July 18, 2010	WISE	WISE	·	2.1 km	MPC · JPL
834334	2010 OQ_{21}	—	February 10, 2007	Mount Lemmon	Mount Lemmon Survey	EMA	3.2 km	MPC · JPL
834335	2010 OA_{22}	—	July 18, 2010	WISE	WISE	LUT	2.7 km	MPC · JPL
834336	2010 OB_{22}	—	July 18, 2010	WISE	WISE	·	3.9 km	MPC · JPL
834337	2010 OX_{22}	—	July 18, 2010	WISE	WISE	·	1.4 km	MPC · JPL
834338	2010 OD_{23}	—	July 18, 2010	WISE	WISE	·	2.1 km	MPC · JPL
834339	2010 OJ_{23}	—	August 31, 2005	Palomar	NEAT	TIN	1.7 km	MPC · JPL
834340	2010 OO_{23}	—	July 18, 2010	WISE	WISE	·	880 m	MPC · JPL
834341	2010 OF_{24}	—	July 18, 2010	WISE	WISE	·	2.3 km	MPC · JPL
834342	2010 OK_{24}	—	July 18, 2010	WISE	WISE	·	880 m	MPC · JPL
834343	2010 OS_{24}	—	July 19, 2010	WISE	WISE	URS	2.9 km	MPC · JPL
834344	2010 OF_{25}	—	July 19, 2010	WISE	WISE	·	1.8 km	MPC · JPL
834345	2010 ON_{25}	—	February 20, 2018	Haleakala	Pan-STARRS 1	·	2.9 km	MPC · JPL
834346	2010 OV_{25}	—	July 19, 2010	WISE	WISE	·	2.4 km	MPC · JPL
834347	2010 OZ_{25}	—	July 19, 2010	WISE	WISE	LUT	3.8 km	MPC · JPL
834348	2010 OV_{26}	—	August 8, 1996	La Silla	E. W. Elst	·	1.4 km	MPC · JPL
834349	2010 OJ_{27}	—	November 18, 2006	Mount Lemmon	Mount Lemmon Survey	·	2.2 km	MPC · JPL
834350	2010 OQ_{27}	—	August 31, 2005	Kitt Peak	Spacewatch	·	2.3 km	MPC · JPL
834351	2010 OR_{27}	—	July 19, 2010	WISE	WISE	KON	2.4 km	MPC · JPL
834352	2010 OU_{28}	—	July 19, 2010	WISE	WISE	·	2.5 km	MPC · JPL
834353	2010 OB_{29}	—	July 19, 2010	WISE	WISE	3:2 · SHU	3.5 km	MPC · JPL
834354	2010 OM_{29}	—	July 19, 2010	WISE	WISE	·	1.9 km	MPC · JPL
834355	2010 OA_{30}	—	July 20, 2010	WISE	WISE	EUP	2.8 km	MPC · JPL
834356	2010 OB_{30}	—	July 20, 2010	WISE	WISE	·	2.1 km	MPC · JPL
834357	2010 OH_{30}	—	December 30, 2005	Mount Lemmon	Mount Lemmon Survey	·	2.3 km	MPC · JPL
834358	2010 OV_{30}	—	July 20, 2010	WISE	WISE	T_{j} (2.95)	2.5 km	MPC · JPL
834359	2010 OJ_{31}	—	July 20, 2010	WISE	WISE	·	2.2 km	MPC · JPL
834360	2010 OY_{31}	—	July 20, 2010	WISE	WISE	·	2.6 km	MPC · JPL
834361	2010 ON_{32}	—	July 20, 2010	WISE	WISE	·	3.5 km	MPC · JPL
834362	2010 OV_{32}	—	July 20, 2010	WISE	WISE	·	2.0 km	MPC · JPL
834363	2010 OB_{33}	—	July 20, 2010	WISE	WISE	·	1.6 km	MPC · JPL
834364	2010 OJ_{34}	—	April 10, 2010	Kitt Peak	Spacewatch	3:2 · SHU	3.6 km	MPC · JPL
834365	2010 OP_{35}	—	July 20, 2010	WISE	WISE	·	2.5 km	MPC · JPL
834366	2010 OC_{36}	—	July 20, 2010	WISE	WISE	·	3.0 km	MPC · JPL
834367	2010 OS_{36}	—	July 21, 2010	WISE	WISE	·	2.3 km	MPC · JPL
834368	2010 OC_{37}	—	July 21, 2010	WISE	WISE	·	4.2 km	MPC · JPL
834369	2010 ON_{37}	—	November 30, 1999	Kitt Peak	Spacewatch	·	2.4 km	MPC · JPL
834370	2010 OQ_{37}	—	July 21, 2010	WISE	WISE	·	4.2 km	MPC · JPL
834371	2010 OT_{37}	—	October 25, 2005	Kitt Peak	Spacewatch	EMA	2.5 km	MPC · JPL
834372	2010 OW_{37}	—	August 13, 2006	Palomar	NEAT	·	1.3 km	MPC · JPL
834373	2010 OX_{37}	—	August 17, 2006	Palomar	NEAT	PHO	1.3 km	MPC · JPL
834374	2010 OL_{38}	—	July 21, 2010	WISE	WISE	·	3.2 km	MPC · JPL
834375	2010 OR_{38}	—	July 21, 2010	WISE	WISE	DOR	1.9 km	MPC · JPL
834376	2010 OC_{39}	—	July 21, 2010	WISE	WISE	T_{j} (2.94)	4.7 km	MPC · JPL
834377	2010 OR_{39}	—	July 21, 2010	WISE	WISE	·	1.5 km	MPC · JPL
834378	2010 OG_{40}	—	July 21, 2010	WISE	WISE	LUT	3.2 km	MPC · JPL
834379	2010 OM_{40}	—	July 21, 2010	WISE	WISE	·	3.0 km	MPC · JPL
834380	2010 OC_{41}	—	July 21, 2010	WISE	WISE	·	2.2 km	MPC · JPL
834381	2010 OM_{41}	—	July 21, 2010	WISE	WISE	·	2.5 km	MPC · JPL
834382	2010 OD_{42}	—	July 21, 2010	WISE	WISE	·	3.8 km	MPC · JPL
834383	2010 ON_{43}	—	July 21, 2010	WISE	WISE	·	3.0 km	MPC · JPL
834384	2010 OA_{45}	—	October 18, 2017	Haleakala	Pan-STARRS 1	·	3.0 km	MPC · JPL
834385	2010 OL_{45}	—	July 22, 2010	WISE	WISE	·	2.1 km	MPC · JPL
834386	2010 OV_{45}	—	July 22, 2010	WISE	WISE	·	2.1 km	MPC · JPL
834387	2010 ON_{46}	—	July 22, 2010	WISE	WISE	KON	1.5 km	MPC · JPL
834388	2010 OA_{47}	—	July 22, 2010	WISE	WISE	·	2.5 km	MPC · JPL
834389	2010 OF_{47}	—	July 22, 2010	WISE	WISE	·	3.2 km	MPC · JPL
834390	2010 ON_{47}	—	May 16, 2010	Mount Lemmon	Mount Lemmon Survey	·	3.2 km	MPC · JPL
834391	2010 OW_{47}	—	July 22, 2010	WISE	WISE	·	1.3 km	MPC · JPL
834392	2010 OL_{48}	—	April 15, 2010	Mount Lemmon	Mount Lemmon Survey	·	600 m	MPC · JPL
834393	2010 OW_{48}	—	July 22, 2010	WISE	WISE	EUP	2.4 km	MPC · JPL
834394	2010 OB_{49}	—	July 22, 2010	WISE	WISE	·	1.7 km	MPC · JPL
834395	2010 OG_{49}	—	July 22, 2010	WISE	WISE	·	2.5 km	MPC · JPL
834396	2010 OW_{49}	—	July 22, 2010	WISE	WISE	PHO	2.5 km	MPC · JPL
834397	2010 OW_{50}	—	July 22, 2010	WISE	WISE	T_{j} (2.93) · 3:2	4.9 km	MPC · JPL
834398	2010 OW_{51}	—	October 21, 2006	Mount Lemmon	Mount Lemmon Survey	·	1.3 km	MPC · JPL
834399	2010 OY_{51}	—	July 22, 2010	WISE	WISE	·	1.9 km	MPC · JPL
834400	2010 OA_{52}	—	July 22, 2010	WISE	WISE	·	3.2 km	MPC · JPL

== 834401–834500 ==
back to top

Designation			Discovery			Properties		Ref
Permanent	Provisional	Named after	Date	Site	Discoverer(s)	Category	Diam.	Ref
834401	2010 OF_{52}	—	September 3, 2000	Sacramento Peak	SDSS	·	1.4 km	MPC · JPL
834402	2010 OJ_{52}	—	July 22, 2010	WISE	WISE	·	3.1 km	MPC · JPL
834403	2010 OL_{52}	—	July 22, 2010	WISE	WISE	·	1.6 km	MPC · JPL
834404	2010 OV_{53}	—	October 21, 2006	Kitt Peak	Spacewatch	LIX	2.7 km	MPC · JPL
834405	2010 OZ_{53}	—	July 23, 2010	WISE	WISE	·	1.2 km	MPC · JPL
834406	2010 OL_{54}	—	July 23, 2010	WISE	WISE	·	2.8 km	MPC · JPL
834407	2010 OW_{54}	—	October 5, 2002	Sacramento Peak	SDSS	3:2 · SHU	4.6 km	MPC · JPL
834408	2010 OZ_{54}	—	July 23, 2010	WISE	WISE	·	4.3 km	MPC · JPL
834409	2010 OV_{55}	—	July 23, 2010	WISE	WISE	·	1.3 km	MPC · JPL
834410	2010 OD_{56}	—	April 20, 2009	Mount Lemmon	Mount Lemmon Survey	·	1.2 km	MPC · JPL
834411	2010 OK_{56}	—	July 23, 2010	WISE	WISE	·	1.0 km	MPC · JPL
834412	2010 OT_{56}	—	April 8, 2010	Mount Lemmon	Mount Lemmon Survey	·	1.2 km	MPC · JPL
834413	2010 OV_{56}	—	July 23, 2010	WISE	WISE	·	3.4 km	MPC · JPL
834414	2010 OX_{57}	—	July 23, 2010	WISE	WISE	·	3.2 km	MPC · JPL
834415	2010 OD_{58}	—	July 23, 2010	WISE	WISE	·	2.4 km	MPC · JPL
834416	2010 OS_{58}	—	July 23, 2010	WISE	WISE	·	2.6 km	MPC · JPL
834417	2010 OT_{58}	—	July 23, 2010	WISE	WISE	·	3.0 km	MPC · JPL
834418	2010 OJ_{59}	—	July 23, 2010	WISE	WISE	·	2.5 km	MPC · JPL
834419	2010 OW_{59}	—	July 23, 2010	WISE	WISE	3:2 · SHU	3.8 km	MPC · JPL
834420	2010 OY_{59}	—	April 25, 2003	Kitt Peak	Spacewatch	EUP	4.3 km	MPC · JPL
834421	2010 OD_{60}	—	July 23, 2010	WISE	WISE	·	2.2 km	MPC · JPL
834422	2010 OP_{61}	—	July 24, 2010	WISE	WISE	T_{j} (2.99)	4.0 km	MPC · JPL
834423	2010 OS_{61}	—	July 24, 2010	WISE	WISE	·	2.7 km	MPC · JPL
834424	2010 OY_{61}	—	December 8, 2017	Haleakala	Pan-STARRS 1	·	630 m	MPC · JPL
834425	2010 OU_{62}	—	November 25, 2016	Mount Lemmon	Mount Lemmon Survey	·	2.6 km	MPC · JPL
834426	2010 OE_{63}	—	July 24, 2010	WISE	WISE	·	2.2 km	MPC · JPL
834427	2010 OT_{63}	—	July 24, 2010	WISE	WISE	LIX	4.4 km	MPC · JPL
834428	2010 OO_{64}	—	July 24, 2010	WISE	WISE	KON	1.4 km	MPC · JPL
834429	2010 OQ_{64}	—	July 24, 2010	WISE	WISE	·	2.9 km	MPC · JPL
834430	2010 OY_{64}	—	July 24, 2010	WISE	WISE	·	3.1 km	MPC · JPL
834431	2010 OD_{65}	—	January 27, 2010	WISE	WISE	·	2.5 km	MPC · JPL
834432	2010 OH_{65}	—	July 24, 2010	WISE	WISE	·	2.8 km	MPC · JPL
834433	2010 OK_{65}	—	July 24, 2010	WISE	WISE	KRM	1.5 km	MPC · JPL
834434	2010 OL_{65}	—	July 24, 2010	WISE	WISE	·	2.4 km	MPC · JPL
834435	2010 OP_{65}	—	September 23, 2004	Kitt Peak	Spacewatch	·	3.0 km	MPC · JPL
834436	2010 OR_{65}	—	July 24, 2010	WISE	WISE	·	2.0 km	MPC · JPL
834437	2010 OR_{66}	—	July 24, 2010	WISE	WISE	·	1.5 km	MPC · JPL
834438	2010 OK_{70}	—	July 25, 2010	WISE	WISE	·	3.5 km	MPC · JPL
834439	2010 OQ_{70}	—	April 11, 2010	Kitt Peak	Spacewatch	·	2.3 km	MPC · JPL
834440	2010 OT_{70}	—	January 28, 2010	WISE	WISE	·	2.3 km	MPC · JPL
834441	2010 OJ_{71}	—	July 25, 2010	WISE	WISE	·	2.0 km	MPC · JPL
834442	2010 OK_{71}	—	July 25, 2010	WISE	WISE	·	2.0 km	MPC · JPL
834443	2010 OP_{72}	—	July 25, 2010	WISE	WISE	·	3.3 km	MPC · JPL
834444	2010 OT_{72}	—	July 25, 2010	WISE	WISE	·	2.1 km	MPC · JPL
834445	2010 OR_{73}	—	July 25, 2010	WISE	WISE	T_{j} (2.99)	2.6 km	MPC · JPL
834446	2010 OM_{75}	—	July 25, 2010	WISE	WISE	·	4.4 km	MPC · JPL
834447	2010 OX_{75}	—	January 27, 2007	Mount Lemmon	Mount Lemmon Survey	·	4.6 km	MPC · JPL
834448	2010 OK_{76}	—	May 10, 2008	Cerro Burek	I. de la Cueva	·	4.7 km	MPC · JPL
834449	2010 OW_{77}	—	July 25, 2010	WISE	WISE	·	2.6 km	MPC · JPL
834450	2010 OL_{78}	—	April 14, 2010	Mount Lemmon	Mount Lemmon Survey	·	1.3 km	MPC · JPL
834451	2010 OF_{82}	—	May 17, 2010	Mount Lemmon	Mount Lemmon Survey	·	2.8 km	MPC · JPL
834452	2010 OY_{82}	—	July 26, 2010	WISE	WISE	·	980 m	MPC · JPL
834453	2010 OD_{83}	—	July 26, 2010	WISE	WISE	·	3.2 km	MPC · JPL
834454	2010 ON_{83}	—	July 26, 2010	WISE	WISE	·	1.1 km	MPC · JPL
834455	2010 OT_{83}	—	July 26, 2010	WISE	WISE	·	2.5 km	MPC · JPL
834456	2010 OT_{85}	—	April 15, 2010	Mount Lemmon	Mount Lemmon Survey	·	1.3 km	MPC · JPL
834457	2010 OH_{86}	—	April 27, 2009	Mount Lemmon	Mount Lemmon Survey	(1547)	1.1 km	MPC · JPL
834458	2010 OJ_{87}	—	July 27, 2010	WISE	WISE	T_{j} (2.97) · 3:2	4.0 km	MPC · JPL
834459	2010 OQ_{87}	—	July 27, 2010	WISE	WISE	·	2.4 km	MPC · JPL
834460	2010 OL_{89}	—	July 27, 2010	WISE	WISE	·	980 m	MPC · JPL
834461	2010 OZ_{89}	—	July 27, 2010	WISE	WISE	·	1.6 km	MPC · JPL
834462	2010 OC_{90}	—	July 27, 2010	WISE	WISE	·	990 m	MPC · JPL
834463	2010 OY_{91}	—	July 27, 2010	WISE	WISE	·	2.4 km	MPC · JPL
834464	2010 OC_{93}	—	July 27, 2010	WISE	WISE	·	1.7 km	MPC · JPL
834465	2010 OW_{93}	—	June 17, 2010	Mount Lemmon	Mount Lemmon Survey	·	3.3 km	MPC · JPL
834466	2010 OM_{94}	—	July 28, 2010	WISE	WISE	·	1.6 km	MPC · JPL
834467	2010 OT_{94}	—	July 28, 2010	WISE	WISE	·	3.3 km	MPC · JPL
834468	2010 OF_{95}	—	July 28, 2010	WISE	WISE	·	2.8 km	MPC · JPL
834469	2010 OH_{95}	—	July 28, 2010	WISE	WISE	·	2.5 km	MPC · JPL
834470	2010 OX_{96}	—	July 28, 2010	WISE	WISE	·	2.0 km	MPC · JPL
834471	2010 OY_{96}	—	July 28, 2010	WISE	WISE	·	690 m	MPC · JPL
834472	2010 OZ_{96}	—	July 28, 2010	WISE	WISE	·	2.6 km	MPC · JPL
834473	2010 OG_{97}	—	July 28, 2010	WISE	WISE	·	1.9 km	MPC · JPL
834474	2010 OC_{98}	—	July 28, 2010	WISE	WISE	·	2.4 km	MPC · JPL
834475	2010 OP_{98}	—	July 28, 2010	WISE	WISE	EUP	2.5 km	MPC · JPL
834476	2010 OW_{98}	—	July 28, 2010	WISE	WISE	·	2.7 km	MPC · JPL
834477	2010 OY_{98}	—	July 28, 2010	WISE	WISE	·	2.5 km	MPC · JPL
834478	2010 OC_{100}	—	April 14, 2010	Kitt Peak	Spacewatch	·	2.3 km	MPC · JPL
834479	2010 OD_{100}	—	August 31, 2017	Haleakala	Pan-STARRS 1	·	2.0 km	MPC · JPL
834480	2010 OO_{100}	—	July 29, 2010	WISE	WISE	EUP	3.4 km	MPC · JPL
834481	2010 OP_{101}	—	July 25, 2010	WISE	WISE	EUN	1.4 km	MPC · JPL
834482	2010 OB_{102}	—	July 28, 2010	WISE	WISE	·	1.8 km	MPC · JPL
834483	2010 OL_{102}	—	July 28, 2010	WISE	WISE	·	1.7 km	MPC · JPL
834484	2010 ON_{102}	—	July 28, 2010	WISE	WISE	·	2.4 km	MPC · JPL
834485	2010 OR_{102}	—	July 28, 2010	WISE	WISE	·	2.2 km	MPC · JPL
834486	2010 OV_{102}	—	September 7, 2004	Socorro	LINEAR	·	3.8 km	MPC · JPL
834487	2010 OX_{102}	—	July 28, 2010	WISE	WISE	·	2.4 km	MPC · JPL
834488	2010 OE_{103}	—	July 28, 2010	WISE	WISE	·	3.3 km	MPC · JPL
834489	2010 OC_{105}	—	July 29, 2010	WISE	WISE	·	1.2 km	MPC · JPL
834490	2010 OX_{106}	—	July 29, 2010	WISE	WISE	LIX	2.4 km	MPC · JPL
834491	2010 OS_{107}	—	July 29, 2010	WISE	WISE	·	2.3 km	MPC · JPL
834492	2010 OC_{108}	—	July 29, 2010	WISE	WISE	·	2.6 km	MPC · JPL
834493	2010 OT_{108}	—	November 20, 2006	Kitt Peak	Spacewatch	·	920 m	MPC · JPL
834494	2010 OR_{109}	—	July 29, 2010	WISE	WISE	·	1.5 km	MPC · JPL
834495	2010 OU_{109}	—	July 29, 2010	WISE	WISE	ELF	2.5 km	MPC · JPL
834496	2010 OY_{111}	—	May 13, 2010	Mount Lemmon	Mount Lemmon Survey	·	2.9 km	MPC · JPL
834497	2010 OC_{112}	—	May 17, 2010	Mount Lemmon	Mount Lemmon Survey	·	1.5 km	MPC · JPL
834498	2010 ON_{112}	—	July 30, 2010	WISE	WISE	·	3.0 km	MPC · JPL
834499	2010 OE_{113}	—	July 30, 2010	WISE	WISE	·	3.0 km	MPC · JPL
834500	2010 OL_{114}	—	July 30, 2010	WISE	WISE	·	1.0 km	MPC · JPL

== 834501–834600 ==
back to top

Designation			Discovery			Properties		Ref
Permanent	Provisional	Named after	Date	Site	Discoverer(s)	Category	Diam.	Ref
834501	2010 OQ_{115}	—	October 25, 2005	Mount Lemmon	Mount Lemmon Survey	·	3.1 km	MPC · JPL
834502	2010 OF_{116}	—	July 30, 2010	WISE	WISE	·	2.4 km	MPC · JPL
834503	2010 OK_{117}	—	April 7, 2008	Mount Lemmon	Mount Lemmon Survey	·	2.8 km	MPC · JPL
834504	2010 OQ_{118}	—	July 30, 2010	WISE	WISE	·	2.2 km	MPC · JPL
834505	2010 OB_{119}	—	July 30, 2010	WISE	WISE	·	2.8 km	MPC · JPL
834506	2010 OD_{119}	—	July 30, 2010	WISE	WISE	EUP	2.9 km	MPC · JPL
834507	2010 OP_{119}	—	September 19, 2006	Kitt Peak	Spacewatch	·	1.9 km	MPC · JPL
834508	2010 OA_{120}	—	July 31, 2010	WISE	WISE	·	2.3 km	MPC · JPL
834509	2010 OB_{120}	—	July 31, 2010	WISE	WISE	TIN	2.7 km	MPC · JPL
834510	2010 OJ_{120}	—	July 31, 2010	WISE	WISE	·	1.3 km	MPC · JPL
834511	2010 OA_{121}	—	July 31, 2010	WISE	WISE	·	3.6 km	MPC · JPL
834512	2010 OE_{121}	—	May 21, 2010	Mount Lemmon	Mount Lemmon Survey	DOR	1.9 km	MPC · JPL
834513	2010 ON_{121}	—	July 31, 2010	WISE	WISE	·	1.7 km	MPC · JPL
834514	2010 OZ_{121}	—	July 31, 2010	WISE	WISE	·	1.5 km	MPC · JPL
834515	2010 OA_{123}	—	July 31, 2010	WISE	WISE	ADE	1.5 km	MPC · JPL
834516	2010 OQ_{123}	—	July 25, 2015	Haleakala	Pan-STARRS 1	·	3.3 km	MPC · JPL
834517	2010 OF_{125}	—	July 31, 2010	WISE	WISE	·	4.2 km	MPC · JPL
834518	2010 OG_{125}	—	July 31, 2010	WISE	WISE	·	2.5 km	MPC · JPL
834519	2010 OX_{128}	—	June 28, 2015	Haleakala	Pan-STARRS 1	·	1.3 km	MPC · JPL
834520	2010 OD_{140}	—	October 10, 2002	Kitt Peak	Spacewatch	T_{j} (2.97) · 3:2	3.4 km	MPC · JPL
834521	2010 OB_{153}	—	August 18, 2017	Haleakala	Pan-STARRS 1	LUT	3.4 km	MPC · JPL
834522	2010 PF	—	November 25, 2006	Kitt Peak	Spacewatch	·	1.3 km	MPC · JPL
834523	2010 PC_{3}	—	January 20, 2015	Haleakala	Pan-STARRS 1	·	2.4 km	MPC · JPL
834524	2010 PP_{3}	—	April 14, 2010	Kitt Peak	Spacewatch	·	3.1 km	MPC · JPL
834525	2010 PX_{3}	—	May 11, 2010	Mount Lemmon	Mount Lemmon Survey	·	1.9 km	MPC · JPL
834526	2010 PE_{4}	—	August 1, 2010	WISE	WISE	·	3.1 km	MPC · JPL
834527	2010 PT_{4}	—	May 13, 2010	Mount Lemmon	Mount Lemmon Survey	·	2.0 km	MPC · JPL
834528	2010 PY_{5}	—	August 1, 2010	WISE	WISE	·	3.8 km	MPC · JPL
834529	2010 PP_{6}	—	May 8, 2010	La Sagra	OAM	(194)	1.3 km	MPC · JPL
834530	2010 PX_{6}	—	February 3, 2009	Mount Lemmon	Mount Lemmon Survey	3:2	4.0 km	MPC · JPL
834531	2010 PH_{7}	—	August 1, 2010	WISE	WISE	·	1.6 km	MPC · JPL
834532	2010 PV_{7}	—	August 1, 2010	WISE	WISE	·	3.0 km	MPC · JPL
834533	2010 PP_{8}	—	August 2, 2010	Socorro	LINEAR	·	1.6 km	MPC · JPL
834534	2010 PL_{12}	—	August 2, 2010	WISE	WISE	LIX	3.3 km	MPC · JPL
834535	2010 PN_{12}	—	August 2, 2010	WISE	WISE	·	4.2 km	MPC · JPL
834536	2010 PX_{12}	—	August 2, 2010	WISE	WISE	·	3.9 km	MPC · JPL
834537	2010 PK_{13}	—	August 2, 2010	WISE	WISE	·	2.9 km	MPC · JPL
834538	2010 PW_{15}	—	August 3, 2010	WISE	WISE	·	2.4 km	MPC · JPL
834539	2010 PF_{18}	—	April 9, 2010	Kitt Peak	Spacewatch	·	1.9 km	MPC · JPL
834540	2010 PK_{20}	—	August 4, 2010	WISE	WISE	·	2.7 km	MPC · JPL
834541	2010 PO_{20}	—	August 4, 2010	WISE	WISE	ADE	2.0 km	MPC · JPL
834542	2010 PO_{22}	—	January 22, 2010	WISE	WISE	·	1.6 km	MPC · JPL
834543	2010 PY_{24}	—	September 26, 2000	Sacramento Peak	SDSS	EOS	2.2 km	MPC · JPL
834544	2010 PN_{27}	—	August 4, 2010	WISE	WISE	·	3.1 km	MPC · JPL
834545	2010 PE_{28}	—	August 5, 2010	WISE	WISE	·	2.4 km	MPC · JPL
834546	2010 PF_{28}	—	August 5, 2010	WISE	WISE	·	2.6 km	MPC · JPL
834547	2010 PL_{28}	—	August 5, 2010	WISE	WISE	·	2.6 km	MPC · JPL
834548	2010 PQ_{28}	—	August 5, 2010	WISE	WISE	TEL	2.4 km	MPC · JPL
834549	2010 PE_{29}	—	November 11, 2006	Kitt Peak	Spacewatch	·	1.5 km	MPC · JPL
834550	2010 PD_{30}	—	August 5, 2010	WISE	WISE	·	2.3 km	MPC · JPL
834551	2010 PN_{30}	—	August 5, 2010	WISE	WISE	3:2	4.8 km	MPC · JPL
834552	2010 PT_{30}	—	August 5, 2010	WISE	WISE	T_{j} (2.99) · 3:2 · SHU	4.4 km	MPC · JPL
834553	2010 PW_{30}	—	August 5, 2010	WISE	WISE	GEF	930 m	MPC · JPL
834554	2010 PA_{31}	—	August 5, 2010	WISE	WISE	·	2.7 km	MPC · JPL
834555	2010 PD_{31}	—	August 5, 2010	WISE	WISE	·	1.6 km	MPC · JPL
834556	2010 PZ_{31}	—	August 5, 2010	WISE	WISE	3:2 · SHU	4.6 km	MPC · JPL
834557	2010 PB_{32}	—	August 5, 2010	WISE	WISE	·	2.8 km	MPC · JPL
834558	2010 PJ_{32}	—	August 5, 2010	WISE	WISE	·	2.8 km	MPC · JPL
834559	2010 PO_{32}	—	August 5, 2010	WISE	WISE	·	2.5 km	MPC · JPL
834560	2010 PX_{32}	—	August 5, 2010	WISE	WISE	EOS	2.5 km	MPC · JPL
834561	2010 PG_{33}	—	August 5, 2010	WISE	WISE	·	2.5 km	MPC · JPL
834562	2010 PR_{33}	—	August 5, 2010	WISE	WISE	LIX	3.1 km	MPC · JPL
834563	2010 PK_{34}	—	August 5, 2010	WISE	WISE	PHO	1.7 km	MPC · JPL
834564	2010 PC_{35}	—	August 5, 2010	WISE	WISE	·	3.1 km	MPC · JPL
834565	2010 PH_{35}	—	August 5, 2010	WISE	WISE	·	2.2 km	MPC · JPL
834566	2010 PK_{35}	—	February 8, 2010	WISE	WISE	·	2.6 km	MPC · JPL
834567	2010 PR_{35}	—	August 5, 2010	WISE	WISE	·	2.5 km	MPC · JPL
834568	2010 PA_{36}	—	August 5, 2010	WISE	WISE	·	2.9 km	MPC · JPL
834569	2010 PB_{36}	—	August 5, 2010	WISE	WISE	·	1.8 km	MPC · JPL
834570	2010 PH_{36}	—	August 5, 2010	WISE	WISE	·	1.9 km	MPC · JPL
834571	2010 PO_{36}	—	August 5, 2010	WISE	WISE	·	2.8 km	MPC · JPL
834572	2010 PC_{37}	—	August 6, 2010	WISE	WISE	LIX	3.1 km	MPC · JPL
834573	2010 PM_{37}	—	August 6, 2010	WISE	WISE	·	4.0 km	MPC · JPL
834574	2010 PW_{38}	—	August 6, 2010	WISE	WISE	·	1.8 km	MPC · JPL
834575	2010 PY_{38}	—	August 6, 2010	WISE	WISE	·	1.7 km	MPC · JPL
834576	2010 PL_{40}	—	August 6, 2010	WISE	WISE	3:2 · (6124)	4.4 km	MPC · JPL
834577	2010 PV_{40}	—	May 7, 2010	Mount Lemmon	Mount Lemmon Survey	·	2.6 km	MPC · JPL
834578	2010 PO_{41}	—	August 6, 2010	WISE	WISE	·	2.1 km	MPC · JPL
834579	2010 PR_{41}	—	August 6, 2010	WISE	WISE	EUP	3.7 km	MPC · JPL
834580	2010 PB_{42}	—	April 10, 2010	Kitt Peak	Spacewatch	GEF	980 m	MPC · JPL
834581	2010 PX_{44}	—	August 6, 2010	WISE	WISE	·	3.5 km	MPC · JPL
834582	2010 PF_{45}	—	August 6, 2010	WISE	WISE	·	2.2 km	MPC · JPL
834583	2010 PQ_{45}	—	January 3, 2009	Kitt Peak	Spacewatch	·	1.8 km	MPC · JPL
834584	2010 PU_{45}	—	August 7, 2010	WISE	WISE	ADE	1.8 km	MPC · JPL
834585	2010 PP_{46}	—	November 8, 1996	Kitt Peak	Spacewatch	·	1.8 km	MPC · JPL
834586	2010 PA_{47}	—	August 7, 2010	WISE	WISE	·	2.5 km	MPC · JPL
834587	2010 PX_{47}	—	August 7, 2010	WISE	WISE	·	2.9 km	MPC · JPL
834588	2010 PP_{48}	—	August 7, 2010	WISE	WISE	·	1.4 km	MPC · JPL
834589	2010 PG_{49}	—	August 7, 2010	WISE	WISE	T_{j} (2.98)	3.3 km	MPC · JPL
834590	2010 PK_{50}	—	August 7, 2010	WISE	WISE	ADE	1.5 km	MPC · JPL
834591	2010 PO_{50}	—	August 7, 2010	WISE	WISE	·	1.9 km	MPC · JPL
834592	2010 PQ_{50}	—	August 7, 2010	WISE	WISE	·	3.0 km	MPC · JPL
834593	2010 PA_{51}	—	January 10, 2007	Mount Lemmon	Mount Lemmon Survey	GEF	2.0 km	MPC · JPL
834594	2010 PH_{51}	—	August 7, 2010	WISE	WISE	·	2.3 km	MPC · JPL
834595	2010 PY_{51}	—	August 8, 2010	WISE	WISE	·	2.2 km	MPC · JPL
834596	2010 PB_{53}	—	April 2, 2019	Haleakala	Pan-STARRS 1	·	3.3 km	MPC · JPL
834597	2010 PE_{53}	—	August 8, 2010	WISE	WISE	·	3.4 km	MPC · JPL
834598	2010 PZ_{55}	—	August 8, 2010	WISE	WISE	·	2.7 km	MPC · JPL
834599	2010 PC_{56}	—	May 16, 2010	Kitt Peak	Spacewatch	DOR	2.5 km	MPC · JPL
834600	2010 PG_{59}	—	May 15, 2010	WISE	WISE	·	2.3 km	MPC · JPL

== 834601–834700 ==
back to top

Designation			Discovery			Properties		Ref
Permanent	Provisional	Named after	Date	Site	Discoverer(s)	Category	Diam.	Ref
834601	2010 PY_{66}	—	August 8, 2010	WISE	WISE	EUP	3.1 km	MPC · JPL
834602	2010 PL_{67}	—	August 8, 2010	WISE	WISE	·	2.2 km	MPC · JPL
834603	2010 PR_{67}	—	July 3, 2005	Mount Lemmon	Mount Lemmon Survey	ADE	2.6 km	MPC · JPL
834604	2010 PB_{68}	—	August 9, 2010	WISE	WISE	·	2.5 km	MPC · JPL
834605	2010 PQ_{68}	—	August 9, 2010	WISE	WISE	T_{j} (2.93)	3.1 km	MPC · JPL
834606	2010 PC_{69}	—	February 17, 2010	WISE	WISE	·	3.4 km	MPC · JPL
834607	2010 PG_{70}	—	February 16, 2010	WISE	WISE	·	3.0 km	MPC · JPL
834608	2010 PO_{70}	—	August 10, 2010	WISE	WISE	LUT	3.1 km	MPC · JPL
834609	2010 PS_{70}	—	August 10, 2010	WISE	WISE	LIX	3.4 km	MPC · JPL
834610	2010 PD_{71}	—	August 10, 2010	WISE	WISE	·	3.1 km	MPC · JPL
834611	2010 PN_{71}	—	August 10, 2010	WISE	WISE	·	2.0 km	MPC · JPL
834612	2010 PA_{80}	—	August 14, 2010	Kitt Peak	Spacewatch	·	1.4 km	MPC · JPL
834613	2010 PL_{87}	—	August 5, 2010	WISE	WISE	·	1.4 km	MPC · JPL
834614	2010 PX_{87}	—	August 5, 2010	WISE	WISE	·	1.6 km	MPC · JPL
834615	2010 PU_{88}	—	March 27, 2009	Catalina	CSS	·	1.6 km	MPC · JPL
834616	2010 PH_{89}	—	August 12, 2010	Kitt Peak	Spacewatch	·	870 m	MPC · JPL
834617	2010 PT_{89}	—	April 12, 2018	Mount Lemmon	Mount Lemmon Survey	·	1.1 km	MPC · JPL
834618	2010 PF_{92}	—	August 10, 2010	Kitt Peak	Spacewatch	·	810 m	MPC · JPL
834619	2010 RG_{4}	—	September 2, 2010	Mount Lemmon	Mount Lemmon Survey	·	840 m	MPC · JPL
834620	2010 RO_{6}	—	September 2, 2010	Mount Lemmon	Mount Lemmon Survey	AGN	780 m	MPC · JPL
834621	2010 RL_{13}	—	September 1, 2010	Mount Lemmon	Mount Lemmon Survey	·	1.7 km	MPC · JPL
834622	2010 RR_{18}	—	September 2, 2010	Mount Lemmon	Mount Lemmon Survey	·	500 m	MPC · JPL
834623	2010 RW_{19}	—	September 3, 2010	Mount Lemmon	Mount Lemmon Survey	·	450 m	MPC · JPL
834624	2010 RU_{22}	—	May 25, 2010	WISE	WISE	·	1.4 km	MPC · JPL
834625	2010 RH_{23}	—	September 3, 2010	Mount Lemmon	Mount Lemmon Survey	·	1.5 km	MPC · JPL
834626	2010 RF_{24}	—	August 12, 2010	Kitt Peak	Spacewatch	MAS	630 m	MPC · JPL
834627	2010 RC_{33}	—	September 1, 2010	Mount Lemmon	Mount Lemmon Survey	·	470 m	MPC · JPL
834628	2010 RV_{33}	—	September 1, 2010	Mount Lemmon	Mount Lemmon Survey	·	710 m	MPC · JPL
834629	2010 RA_{34}	—	September 1, 2010	Mount Lemmon	Mount Lemmon Survey	·	1.7 km	MPC · JPL
834630	2010 RN_{42}	—	September 4, 2010	Sierra Stars	M. Ory	·	1.1 km	MPC · JPL
834631	2010 RF_{44}	—	September 5, 2010	SM Montmagastrell	Bosch, J. M.	·	980 m	MPC · JPL
834632	2010 RP_{44}	—	September 2, 2010	Mount Lemmon	Mount Lemmon Survey	·	1.4 km	MPC · JPL
834633	2010 RL_{61}	—	September 6, 2010	Kitt Peak	Spacewatch	MAS	550 m	MPC · JPL
834634	2010 RS_{61}	—	September 6, 2010	Kitt Peak	Spacewatch	·	880 m	MPC · JPL
834635	2010 RN_{64}	—	September 10, 2010	La Silla	D. L. Rabinowitz, M. E. Schwamb, S. Tourtellotte	cubewano (hot)	391 km	MPC · JPL
834636	2010 RM_{81}	—	September 11, 2010	La Sagra	OAM	·	1.1 km	MPC · JPL
834637	2010 RB_{89}	—	September 11, 2010	Mount Lemmon	Mount Lemmon Survey	·	1.5 km	MPC · JPL
834638	2010 RV_{96}	—	August 20, 2010	La Sagra	OAM	·	530 m	MPC · JPL
834639	2010 RQ_{97}	—	September 10, 2010	Kitt Peak	Spacewatch	·	430 m	MPC · JPL
834640	2010 RU_{116}	—	July 13, 2010	WISE	WISE	GEF	960 m	MPC · JPL
834641	2010 RZ_{119}	—	September 14, 2010	Mount Lemmon	Mount Lemmon Survey	·	1.5 km	MPC · JPL
834642	2010 RL_{125}	—	September 12, 2010	Kitt Peak	Spacewatch	NYS	930 m	MPC · JPL
834643	2010 RS_{136}	—	September 15, 2010	Kitt Peak	Spacewatch	·	1.0 km	MPC · JPL
834644	2010 RD_{139}	—	September 2, 2010	Mount Lemmon	Mount Lemmon Survey	·	1.0 km	MPC · JPL
834645	2010 RM_{147}	—	September 14, 2010	Kitt Peak	Spacewatch	·	710 m	MPC · JPL
834646	2010 RS_{148}	—	October 24, 1995	Kitt Peak	Spacewatch	·	800 m	MPC · JPL
834647	2010 RZ_{149}	—	June 10, 2010	WISE	WISE	·	1.4 km	MPC · JPL
834648	2010 RG_{151}	—	September 15, 2010	Kitt Peak	Spacewatch	·	2.3 km	MPC · JPL
834649	2010 RQ_{151}	—	September 5, 2010	Kitt Peak	Spacewatch	NYS	820 m	MPC · JPL
834650	2010 RO_{154}	—	September 15, 2010	Kitt Peak	Spacewatch	·	660 m	MPC · JPL
834651	2010 RY_{163}	—	September 5, 2010	Mount Lemmon	Mount Lemmon Survey	H	300 m	MPC · JPL
834652	2010 RM_{170}	—	September 3, 2010	Mount Lemmon	Mount Lemmon Survey	EOS	1.2 km	MPC · JPL
834653	2010 RT_{170}	—	September 3, 2010	Mount Lemmon	Mount Lemmon Survey	EOS	1.2 km	MPC · JPL
834654	2010 RW_{172}	—	September 5, 2010	Mount Lemmon	Mount Lemmon Survey	·	780 m	MPC · JPL
834655	2010 RD_{188}	—	September 8, 2010	Haleakala	Pan-STARRS 1	cubewano (hot)	332 km	MPC · JPL
834656	2010 RG_{189}	—	September 3, 2010	Mount Lemmon	Mount Lemmon Survey	·	900 m	MPC · JPL
834657	2010 RO_{192}	—	June 20, 2010	WISE	WISE	·	1.1 km	MPC · JPL
834658	2010 RS_{192}	—	July 29, 2010	WISE	WISE	·	1.1 km	MPC · JPL
834659	2010 RJ_{193}	—	August 13, 2010	Kitt Peak	Spacewatch	·	2.0 km	MPC · JPL
834660	2010 RP_{194}	—	March 18, 2013	Mount Lemmon	Mount Lemmon Survey	·	2.4 km	MPC · JPL
834661	2010 RV_{194}	—	July 15, 2010	WISE	WISE	·	1.7 km	MPC · JPL
834662	2010 RZ_{195}	—	September 2, 2010	Mount Lemmon	Mount Lemmon Survey	·	890 m	MPC · JPL
834663	2010 RM_{197}	—	September 3, 2010	Mount Lemmon	Mount Lemmon Survey	·	1.3 km	MPC · JPL
834664	2010 RW_{198}	—	June 25, 2010	WISE	WISE	·	1.7 km	MPC · JPL
834665	2010 RP_{199}	—	June 3, 2010	WISE	WISE	·	3.0 km	MPC · JPL
834666	2010 RH_{200}	—	October 8, 2015	Haleakala	Pan-STARRS 1	·	1.1 km	MPC · JPL
834667	2010 RF_{201}	—	September 3, 2010	Mount Lemmon	Mount Lemmon Survey	JUN	770 m	MPC · JPL
834668	2010 RK_{202}	—	June 10, 2010	WISE	WISE	EOS	1.6 km	MPC · JPL
834669	2010 RQ_{202}	—	May 8, 2014	Haleakala	Pan-STARRS 1	·	1.5 km	MPC · JPL
834670	2010 RA_{203}	—	September 3, 2010	Mount Lemmon	Mount Lemmon Survey	·	1.3 km	MPC · JPL
834671	2010 RB_{206}	—	April 14, 2013	Calar Alto	F. Hormuth	MAS	570 m	MPC · JPL
834672	2010 RK_{206}	—	September 4, 2010	Mount Lemmon	Mount Lemmon Survey	EUN	920 m	MPC · JPL
834673	2010 RM_{206}	—	September 11, 2010	Kitt Peak	Spacewatch	·	2.0 km	MPC · JPL
834674	2010 RZ_{206}	—	September 9, 2010	Kitt Peak	Spacewatch	·	1.8 km	MPC · JPL
834675	2010 RG_{207}	—	September 15, 2010	Mount Lemmon	Mount Lemmon Survey	AGN	910 m	MPC · JPL
834676	2010 RD_{208}	—	September 2, 2010	Mount Lemmon	Mount Lemmon Survey	·	1.8 km	MPC · JPL
834677	2010 RP_{208}	—	September 5, 2010	Mount Lemmon	Mount Lemmon Survey	·	1.6 km	MPC · JPL
834678	2010 RR_{208}	—	September 15, 2010	Mount Lemmon	Mount Lemmon Survey	·	530 m	MPC · JPL
834679	2010 RV_{210}	—	September 10, 2010	Mount Lemmon	Mount Lemmon Survey	H	300 m	MPC · JPL
834680	2010 RM_{212}	—	September 1, 2010	Mount Lemmon	Mount Lemmon Survey	·	430 m	MPC · JPL
834681	2010 RE_{214}	—	April 27, 2017	Haleakala	Pan-STARRS 1	·	780 m	MPC · JPL
834682	2010 RZ_{217}	—	September 2, 2010	Mount Lemmon	Mount Lemmon Survey	·	750 m	MPC · JPL
834683	2010 RT_{220}	—	September 1, 2010	Mount Lemmon	Mount Lemmon Survey	EOS	1.3 km	MPC · JPL
834684	2010 RH_{229}	—	September 30, 2010	Mount Lemmon	Mount Lemmon Survey	·	1.2 km	MPC · JPL
834685	2010 SG_{2}	—	September 16, 2010	Mount Lemmon	Mount Lemmon Survey	·	880 m	MPC · JPL
834686	2010 SG_{10}	—	September 17, 2010	Mount Lemmon	Mount Lemmon Survey	·	2.1 km	MPC · JPL
834687	2010 SE_{14}	—	October 9, 1993	La Silla	E. W. Elst	·	3.6 km	MPC · JPL
834688	2010 SG_{16}	—	September 4, 2010	Kitt Peak	Spacewatch	H	320 m	MPC · JPL
834689	2010 SX_{16}	—	September 27, 2010	WISE	WISE	PHO	770 m	MPC · JPL
834690	2010 SJ_{17}	—	September 19, 2010	Kitt Peak	Spacewatch	·	1.4 km	MPC · JPL
834691	2010 ST_{19}	—	August 23, 2001	Kitt Peak	Spacewatch	T_{j} (2.97)	3.6 km	MPC · JPL
834692	2010 SH_{25}	—	September 29, 2010	Mount Lemmon	Mount Lemmon Survey	·	1.4 km	MPC · JPL
834693	2010 SH_{29}	—	September 12, 2010	Kitt Peak	Spacewatch	ERI	1.2 km	MPC · JPL
834694	2010 SG_{32}	—	June 26, 2010	WISE	WISE	·	1.0 km	MPC · JPL
834695	2010 SH_{32}	—	September 30, 2010	Mount Lemmon	Mount Lemmon Survey	·	2.1 km	MPC · JPL
834696	2010 SN_{40}	—	October 20, 2003	Kitt Peak	Spacewatch	NYS	630 m	MPC · JPL
834697	2010 SX_{41}	—	October 7, 2010	Catalina	CSS	·	2.6 km	MPC · JPL
834698	2010 SP_{44}	—	September 18, 2010	Kitt Peak	Spacewatch	·	1.1 km	MPC · JPL
834699	2010 SX_{46}	—	September 16, 2010	Mount Lemmon	Mount Lemmon Survey	·	1.1 km	MPC · JPL
834700	2010 SW_{47}	—	May 8, 2013	Haleakala	Pan-STARRS 1	·	640 m	MPC · JPL

== 834701–834800 ==
back to top

Designation			Discovery			Properties		Ref
Permanent	Provisional	Named after	Date	Site	Discoverer(s)	Category	Diam.	Ref
834701	2010 SS_{49}	—	June 11, 2010	WISE	WISE	DOR	2.0 km	MPC · JPL
834702	2010 ST_{49}	—	September 18, 2010	Mount Lemmon	Mount Lemmon Survey	·	430 m	MPC · JPL
834703	2010 SA_{51}	—	September 30, 2010	Mount Lemmon	Mount Lemmon Survey	3:2	4.0 km	MPC · JPL
834704	2010 SX_{51}	—	July 16, 2010	WISE	WISE	T_{j} (2.98) · 3:2	4.9 km	MPC · JPL
834705	2010 SG_{53}	—	January 17, 2016	Haleakala	Pan-STARRS 1	RAF	520 m	MPC · JPL
834706	2010 SG_{54}	—	September 30, 2010	Mount Lemmon	Mount Lemmon Survey	·	1.8 km	MPC · JPL
834707	2010 SF_{64}	—	September 17, 2010	Mount Lemmon	Mount Lemmon Survey	3:2	4.3 km	MPC · JPL
834708	2010 SB_{69}	—	September 18, 2010	Mount Lemmon	Mount Lemmon Survey	·	430 m	MPC · JPL
834709	2010 TE_{1}	—	October 1, 2010	Kitt Peak	Spacewatch	·	1.4 km	MPC · JPL
834710	2010 TN_{1}	—	October 1, 2010	Kitt Peak	Spacewatch	H	360 m	MPC · JPL
834711	2010 TS_{7}	—	September 16, 2003	Kitt Peak	Spacewatch	·	390 m	MPC · JPL
834712	2010 TL_{19}	—	October 7, 2010	Kitt Peak	Spacewatch	·	300 m	MPC · JPL
834713	2010 TF_{26}	—	October 2, 2010	Kitt Peak	Spacewatch	·	1.3 km	MPC · JPL
834714	2010 TU_{36}	—	November 26, 2000	Sacramento Peak	SDSS	H	780 m	MPC · JPL
834715	2010 TU_{38}	—	September 7, 2010	Piszkés-tető	K. Sárneczky, Z. Kuli	·	1.1 km	MPC · JPL
834716	2010 TU_{39}	—	October 2, 2010	Kitt Peak	Spacewatch	·	1.2 km	MPC · JPL
834717	2010 TW_{39}	—	October 2, 2010	Kitt Peak	Spacewatch	·	1.5 km	MPC · JPL
834718	2010 TM_{43}	—	October 2, 2010	Kitt Peak	Spacewatch	EOS	1.2 km	MPC · JPL
834719	2010 TC_{63}	—	July 8, 2010	WISE	WISE	·	1.9 km	MPC · JPL
834720	2010 TP_{66}	—	June 18, 2010	WISE	WISE	·	1.7 km	MPC · JPL
834721	2010 TL_{67}	—	September 2, 2010	Mount Lemmon	Mount Lemmon Survey	EOS	1.4 km	MPC · JPL
834722	2010 TC_{68}	—	October 8, 2010	Kitt Peak	Spacewatch	·	640 m	MPC · JPL
834723	2010 TX_{68}	—	June 4, 2006	Mount Lemmon	Mount Lemmon Survey	·	950 m	MPC · JPL
834724	2010 TF_{74}	—	October 8, 2010	Kitt Peak	Spacewatch	·	1.2 km	MPC · JPL
834725	2010 TO_{74}	—	September 17, 2010	Kitt Peak	Spacewatch	MAS	510 m	MPC · JPL
834726	2010 TT_{76}	—	July 11, 2010	WISE	WISE	·	1.3 km	MPC · JPL
834727	2010 TF_{82}	—	October 9, 2010	Kitt Peak	Spacewatch	H	340 m	MPC · JPL
834728	2010 TJ_{83}	—	September 1, 2010	Mount Lemmon	Mount Lemmon Survey	·	1.3 km	MPC · JPL
834729	2010 TW_{85}	—	September 1, 2005	Kitt Peak	Spacewatch	KOR	1.1 km	MPC · JPL
834730	2010 TU_{88}	—	October 1, 2010	Mount Lemmon	Mount Lemmon Survey	·	890 m	MPC · JPL
834731	2010 TY_{94}	—	October 25, 2005	Mount Lemmon	Mount Lemmon Survey	·	1.5 km	MPC · JPL
834732	2010 TG_{103}	—	March 20, 1999	Sacramento Peak	SDSS	·	1.2 km	MPC · JPL
834733	2010 TM_{106}	—	December 30, 2007	Kitt Peak	Spacewatch	NYS	520 m	MPC · JPL
834734	2010 TO_{109}	—	July 7, 2010	WISE	WISE	·	2.6 km	MPC · JPL
834735	2010 TA_{115}	—	September 10, 2010	Kitt Peak	Spacewatch	·	1.6 km	MPC · JPL
834736	2010 TK_{117}	—	October 14, 2001	Sacramento Peak	SDSS	·	1.3 km	MPC · JPL
834737	2010 TE_{118}	—	July 12, 2010	WISE	WISE	·	2.0 km	MPC · JPL
834738	2010 TR_{119}	—	October 9, 2010	Dauban	C. Rinner, Kugel, F.	DOR	1.5 km	MPC · JPL
834739	2010 TO_{121}	—	August 19, 2006	Kitt Peak	Spacewatch	·	880 m	MPC · JPL
834740	2010 TO_{123}	—	October 1, 2010	Kitt Peak	Spacewatch	MAS	540 m	MPC · JPL
834741	2010 TT_{126}	—	October 10, 2010	Kitt Peak	Spacewatch	H	330 m	MPC · JPL
834742	2010 TD_{133}	—	October 11, 2010	Mount Lemmon	Mount Lemmon Survey	PHO	830 m	MPC · JPL
834743	2010 TB_{134}	—	October 11, 2010	Mount Lemmon	Mount Lemmon Survey	·	1.3 km	MPC · JPL
834744	2010 TA_{139}	—	October 11, 2010	Mount Lemmon	Mount Lemmon Survey	·	1.1 km	MPC · JPL
834745	2010 TT_{140}	—	September 16, 2010	Mount Lemmon	Mount Lemmon Survey	·	1.7 km	MPC · JPL
834746	2010 TM_{150}	—	May 16, 2010	WISE	WISE	·	670 m	MPC · JPL
834747	2010 TH_{155}	—	October 10, 2010	Westfield	R. Holmes, S. Foglia	PHO	810 m	MPC · JPL
834748	2010 TO_{155}	—	October 10, 2010	Kitt Peak	Spacewatch	MAS	540 m	MPC · JPL
834749	2010 TP_{155}	—	May 13, 2009	Mount Lemmon	Mount Lemmon Survey	·	1.5 km	MPC · JPL
834750	2010 TE_{159}	—	July 13, 2010	WISE	WISE	3:2	3.6 km	MPC · JPL
834751	2010 TS_{159}	—	January 14, 2008	Kitt Peak	Spacewatch	·	470 m	MPC · JPL
834752	2010 TV_{165}	—	September 18, 2010	Mount Lemmon	Mount Lemmon Survey	·	1.8 km	MPC · JPL
834753	2010 TK_{166}	—	September 14, 1993	La Silla	H. Debehogne, E. W. Elst	·	760 m	MPC · JPL
834754	2010 TX_{174}	—	August 29, 2001	Palomar	NEAT	·	1.5 km	MPC · JPL
834755	2010 TE_{175}	—	October 2, 2010	Nogales	M. Schwartz, P. R. Holvorcem	·	1.0 km	MPC · JPL
834756	2010 TW_{178}	—	October 1, 2010	Kitt Peak	Spacewatch	·	850 m	MPC · JPL
834757	2010 TN_{184}	—	July 12, 2010	WISE	WISE	·	2.6 km	MPC · JPL
834758	2010 TB_{186}	—	January 10, 2007	Kitt Peak	Spacewatch	DOR	1.6 km	MPC · JPL
834759	2010 TJ_{193}	—	March 31, 2008	Mount Lemmon	Mount Lemmon Survey	·	2.3 km	MPC · JPL
834760	2010 TS_{198}	—	October 11, 2010	Mount Lemmon	Mount Lemmon Survey	·	460 m	MPC · JPL
834761	2010 TW_{198}	—	June 19, 2010	WISE	WISE	·	2.5 km	MPC · JPL
834762	2010 TD_{199}	—	June 25, 2010	WISE	WISE	·	1.2 km	MPC · JPL
834763	2010 TL_{199}	—	November 1, 2014	Mount Lemmon	Mount Lemmon Survey	·	940 m	MPC · JPL
834764	2010 TA_{200}	—	October 14, 2010	Mount Lemmon	Mount Lemmon Survey	EOS	1.3 km	MPC · JPL
834765	2010 TO_{200}	—	October 13, 2010	Mount Lemmon	Mount Lemmon Survey	·	830 m	MPC · JPL
834766	2010 TB_{203}	—	July 10, 2010	WISE	WISE	·	1.4 km	MPC · JPL
834767	2010 TW_{205}	—	January 28, 2017	Haleakala	Pan-STARRS 1	·	1.6 km	MPC · JPL
834768	2010 TF_{206}	—	March 8, 2017	Mount Lemmon	Mount Lemmon Survey	·	1.3 km	MPC · JPL
834769	2010 TZ_{207}	—	November 22, 2014	Mount Lemmon	Mount Lemmon Survey	·	790 m	MPC · JPL
834770	2010 TH_{216}	—	October 11, 2010	Mount Lemmon	Mount Lemmon Survey	·	1.3 km	MPC · JPL
834771	2010 TO_{217}	—	October 13, 2010	Mount Lemmon	Mount Lemmon Survey	·	1.4 km	MPC · JPL
834772	2010 TP_{217}	—	October 13, 2010	Mount Lemmon	Mount Lemmon Survey	EOS	1.3 km	MPC · JPL
834773	2010 TG_{218}	—	October 1, 2010	Mount Lemmon	Mount Lemmon Survey	·	1.7 km	MPC · JPL
834774	2010 TH_{219}	—	October 1, 2010	Mount Lemmon	Mount Lemmon Survey	·	1.0 km	MPC · JPL
834775	2010 TX_{222}	—	October 2, 2010	Kitt Peak	Spacewatch	T_{j} (2.98) · 3:2	3.8 km	MPC · JPL
834776	2010 TN_{229}	—	October 12, 2010	Mount Lemmon	Mount Lemmon Survey	·	820 m	MPC · JPL
834777	2010 TT_{229}	—	October 12, 2010	Mount Lemmon	Mount Lemmon Survey	·	2.1 km	MPC · JPL
834778	2010 TH_{230}	—	October 2, 2010	Kitt Peak	Spacewatch	·	1.8 km	MPC · JPL
834779	2010 TT_{231}	—	September 9, 2015	Haleakala	Pan-STARRS 1	EOS	1.1 km	MPC · JPL
834780	2010 TC_{232}	—	October 13, 2010	Kitt Peak	Spacewatch	·	2.2 km	MPC · JPL
834781	2010 TR_{232}	—	October 12, 2010	Mount Lemmon	Mount Lemmon Survey	·	2.0 km	MPC · JPL
834782	2010 TN_{236}	—	October 1, 2010	Mount Lemmon	Mount Lemmon Survey	·	1.3 km	MPC · JPL
834783	2010 TP_{240}	—	October 1, 2010	Mount Lemmon	Mount Lemmon Survey	·	820 m	MPC · JPL
834784	2010 UT	—	July 25, 2010	WISE	WISE	·	1.9 km	MPC · JPL
834785	2010 UB_{1}	—	July 27, 2010	WISE	WISE	JUN	1.1 km	MPC · JPL
834786	2010 UU_{6}	—	October 3, 2010	Catalina	CSS	·	960 m	MPC · JPL
834787	2010 UG_{9}	—	October 28, 2010	Kitt Peak	Spacewatch	·	1.5 km	MPC · JPL
834788	2010 UJ_{13}	—	October 28, 2006	Mount Lemmon	Mount Lemmon Survey	·	770 m	MPC · JPL
834789	2010 UR_{13}	—	August 6, 2010	WISE	WISE	3:2 · SHU	4.5 km	MPC · JPL
834790	2010 UC_{14}	—	October 12, 2010	Vail-Jarnac	Glinos, T.	BAR	1.0 km	MPC · JPL
834791	2010 UN_{18}	—	October 28, 2010	Mount Lemmon	Mount Lemmon Survey	AST	1.2 km	MPC · JPL
834792	2010 UG_{19}	—	December 6, 2005	Kitt Peak	Spacewatch	·	1.7 km	MPC · JPL
834793	2010 UB_{30}	—	July 31, 2010	WISE	WISE	T_{j} (2.99) · 3:2	4.8 km	MPC · JPL
834794	2010 UF_{30}	—	August 11, 2010	Kitt Peak	Spacewatch	·	1.1 km	MPC · JPL
834795	2010 UC_{32}	—	October 29, 2010	Kitt Peak	Spacewatch	H	400 m	MPC · JPL
834796	2010 UD_{38}	—	October 29, 2010	Piszkés-tető	K. Sárneczky, S. Kürti	·	480 m	MPC · JPL
834797	2010 UD_{42}	—	October 25, 2005	Kitt Peak	Spacewatch	·	1.0 km	MPC · JPL
834798	2010 UL_{43}	—	November 10, 2005	Kitt Peak	Spacewatch	·	1.5 km	MPC · JPL
834799	2010 UH_{45}	—	July 31, 2010	WISE	WISE	·	2.5 km	MPC · JPL
834800	2010 UW_{45}	—	October 30, 2010	Mount Lemmon	Mount Lemmon Survey	EOS	1.3 km	MPC · JPL

== 834801–834900 ==
back to top

Designation			Discovery			Properties		Ref
Permanent	Provisional	Named after	Date	Site	Discoverer(s)	Category	Diam.	Ref
834801	2010 US_{48}	—	September 11, 2010	Mount Lemmon	Mount Lemmon Survey	MAS	510 m	MPC · JPL
834802	2010 UR_{53}	—	October 29, 2010	Kitt Peak	Spacewatch	·	1.4 km	MPC · JPL
834803	2010 UA_{60}	—	October 14, 2001	Sacramento Peak	SDSS	·	1.3 km	MPC · JPL
834804	2010 UO_{61}	—	April 22, 2009	Mount Lemmon	Mount Lemmon Survey	·	1.1 km	MPC · JPL
834805	2010 UZ_{61}	—	October 8, 2010	Westfield	International Astronomical Search Collaboration	·	550 m	MPC · JPL
834806	2010 UA_{62}	—	October 13, 2010	Mount Lemmon	Mount Lemmon Survey	·	640 m	MPC · JPL
834807	2010 UB_{64}	—	October 31, 2010	Piszkés-tető	K. Sárneczky, S. Kürti	·	1.4 km	MPC · JPL
834808	2010 UD_{65}	—	September 30, 2010	Mount Lemmon	Mount Lemmon Survey	·	1.5 km	MPC · JPL
834809	2010 UB_{66}	—	July 29, 2010	WISE	WISE	·	1.2 km	MPC · JPL
834810	2010 UG_{69}	—	October 31, 2010	Piszkés-tető	K. Sárneczky, Z. Kuli	·	1.6 km	MPC · JPL
834811	2010 UZ_{73}	—	October 13, 2010	Mount Lemmon	Mount Lemmon Survey	·	1.2 km	MPC · JPL
834812	2010 UQ_{76}	—	July 26, 2010	WISE	WISE	·	1.4 km	MPC · JPL
834813	2010 UO_{79}	—	September 24, 1960	Palomar Mountain	C. J. van Houten, I. van Houten-Groeneveld, T. Gehrels	·	1.5 km	MPC · JPL
834814	2010 UR_{79}	—	October 13, 2010	Mount Lemmon	Mount Lemmon Survey	·	840 m	MPC · JPL
834815	2010 US_{79}	—	October 30, 2010	Mount Lemmon	Mount Lemmon Survey	·	2.4 km	MPC · JPL
834816	2010 UF_{80}	—	October 30, 2010	Mount Lemmon	Mount Lemmon Survey	·	2.6 km	MPC · JPL
834817	2010 UO_{90}	—	October 31, 2010	Mount Lemmon	Mount Lemmon Survey	MAS	550 m	MPC · JPL
834818	2010 UL_{96}	—	July 23, 2010	WISE	WISE	·	1.1 km	MPC · JPL
834819	2010 UW_{103}	—	October 29, 2010	Mauna Kea	M. Micheli	·	480 m	MPC · JPL
834820	2010 UQ_{107}	—	November 3, 2010	Mount Lemmon	Mount Lemmon Survey	·	1.3 km	MPC · JPL
834821	2010 UE_{109}	—	October 17, 2010	Mount Lemmon	Mount Lemmon Survey	·	880 m	MPC · JPL
834822	2010 UG_{110}	—	October 17, 2010	Mount Lemmon	Mount Lemmon Survey	·	1.6 km	MPC · JPL
834823	2010 UM_{110}	—	January 24, 2007	Mount Lemmon	Mount Lemmon Survey	·	1.9 km	MPC · JPL
834824	2010 UR_{111}	—	October 30, 2010	Mount Lemmon	Mount Lemmon Survey	(5)	730 m	MPC · JPL
834825	2010 UF_{112}	—	October 29, 2010	Mount Lemmon	Mount Lemmon Survey	·	750 m	MPC · JPL
834826	2010 UC_{113}	—	July 25, 2010	WISE	WISE	·	2.1 km	MPC · JPL
834827	2010 US_{115}	—	July 25, 2010	WISE	WISE	·	1.4 km	MPC · JPL
834828	2010 UV_{115}	—	June 5, 2010	WISE	WISE	·	1.2 km	MPC · JPL
834829	2010 UK_{117}	—	August 5, 2010	WISE	WISE	·	2.3 km	MPC · JPL
834830	2010 UT_{121}	—	October 19, 2010	Mount Lemmon	Mount Lemmon Survey	ERI	1.1 km	MPC · JPL
834831	2010 UB_{122}	—	October 31, 2010	Mount Lemmon	Mount Lemmon Survey	EOS	1.4 km	MPC · JPL
834832	2010 UK_{122}	—	November 25, 2005	Mount Lemmon	Mount Lemmon Survey	·	1.2 km	MPC · JPL
834833	2010 UE_{124}	—	October 17, 2010	Mount Lemmon	Mount Lemmon Survey	EOS	1.4 km	MPC · JPL
834834	2010 UV_{129}	—	October 17, 2010	Mount Lemmon	Mount Lemmon Survey	EOS	1.4 km	MPC · JPL
834835	2010 UR_{137}	—	October 17, 2010	Mount Lemmon	Mount Lemmon Survey	·	640 m	MPC · JPL
834836	2010 VM_{7}	—	September 19, 2010	Mount Lemmon	Mount Lemmon Survey	·	1.9 km	MPC · JPL
834837	2010 VZ_{10}	—	August 23, 2004	Kitt Peak	Spacewatch	EOS	1.4 km	MPC · JPL
834838	2010 VJ_{11}	—	September 25, 1990	Kitt Peak	Spacewatch	·	460 m	MPC · JPL
834839	2010 VD_{14}	—	September 17, 2010	Mount Lemmon	Mount Lemmon Survey	·	1.9 km	MPC · JPL
834840	2010 VU_{22}	—	November 1, 2010	Mount Lemmon	Mount Lemmon Survey	·	1.2 km	MPC · JPL
834841	2010 VM_{25}	—	November 1, 2010	Kitt Peak	Spacewatch	·	2.1 km	MPC · JPL
834842	2010 VV_{32}	—	November 3, 2010	Mount Lemmon	Mount Lemmon Survey	·	1.3 km	MPC · JPL
834843	2010 VF_{39}	—	November 5, 2010	La Sagra	OAM	·	1.5 km	MPC · JPL
834844	2010 VK_{45}	—	October 14, 2010	Mount Lemmon	Mount Lemmon Survey	·	1.0 km	MPC · JPL
834845	2010 VM_{47}	—	November 2, 2010	Kitt Peak	Spacewatch	·	2.9 km	MPC · JPL
834846	2010 VS_{50}	—	November 3, 2010	Mount Lemmon	Mount Lemmon Survey	·	1.3 km	MPC · JPL
834847	2010 VV_{54}	—	November 3, 2010	Mount Lemmon	Mount Lemmon Survey	MAS	470 m	MPC · JPL
834848	2010 VS_{55}	—	November 3, 2010	Mount Lemmon	Mount Lemmon Survey	·	850 m	MPC · JPL
834849	2010 VS_{63}	—	September 30, 2010	Mount Lemmon	Mount Lemmon Survey	·	1.1 km	MPC · JPL
834850	2010 VY_{73}	—	August 6, 2010	WISE	WISE	·	2.0 km	MPC · JPL
834851	2010 VJ_{75}	—	October 2, 2010	Mount Lemmon	Mount Lemmon Survey	PHO	800 m	MPC · JPL
834852	2010 VX_{75}	—	November 8, 2010	Mount Lemmon	Mount Lemmon Survey	·	2.3 km	MPC · JPL
834853	2010 VZ_{88}	—	October 29, 2010	Kitt Peak	Spacewatch	·	2.0 km	MPC · JPL
834854	2010 VH_{89}	—	November 12, 2005	Kitt Peak	Spacewatch	·	1.9 km	MPC · JPL
834855	2010 VK_{89}	—	October 13, 2010	Mount Lemmon	Mount Lemmon Survey	·	2.4 km	MPC · JPL
834856	2010 VS_{91}	—	November 6, 2010	Kitt Peak	Spacewatch	·	650 m	MPC · JPL
834857	2010 VP_{96}	—	November 8, 2010	Kitt Peak	Spacewatch	EOS	1.4 km	MPC · JPL
834858	2010 VZ_{96}	—	September 27, 2006	Catalina	CSS	·	920 m	MPC · JPL
834859	2010 VH_{104}	—	August 8, 2010	WISE	WISE	·	1.6 km	MPC · JPL
834860	2010 VJ_{105}	—	October 28, 2010	Mount Lemmon	Mount Lemmon Survey	·	1.9 km	MPC · JPL
834861	2010 VH_{112}	—	November 7, 2010	Kitt Peak	Spacewatch	·	680 m	MPC · JPL
834862	2010 VY_{112}	—	September 5, 2010	Mount Lemmon	Mount Lemmon Survey	·	1.6 km	MPC · JPL
834863	2010 VG_{124}	—	November 8, 2010	Mount Lemmon	Mount Lemmon Survey	·	2.0 km	MPC · JPL
834864	2010 VF_{126}	—	November 8, 2010	Kitt Peak	Spacewatch	·	1.5 km	MPC · JPL
834865	2010 VK_{126}	—	November 8, 2010	Kitt Peak	Spacewatch	·	810 m	MPC · JPL
834866	2010 VB_{128}	—	September 30, 2010	Mount Lemmon	Mount Lemmon Survey	·	860 m	MPC · JPL
834867	2010 VJ_{128}	—	November 4, 1999	Kitt Peak	Spacewatch	·	800 m	MPC · JPL
834868	2010 VV_{128}	—	November 25, 2005	Kitt Peak	Spacewatch	EOS	1.5 km	MPC · JPL
834869	2010 VZ_{130}	—	October 13, 2010	Mount Lemmon	Mount Lemmon Survey	·	2.5 km	MPC · JPL
834870	2010 VR_{133}	—	December 18, 2001	Sacramento Peak	SDSS	BRA	1.4 km	MPC · JPL
834871	2010 VQ_{134}	—	August 30, 2005	Mauna Kea	P. A. Wiegert	·	1.2 km	MPC · JPL
834872	2010 VF_{144}	—	August 17, 2009	Kitt Peak	Spacewatch	3:2	4.3 km	MPC · JPL
834873	2010 VR_{154}	—	November 7, 2010	Mount Lemmon	Mount Lemmon Survey	EOS	1.5 km	MPC · JPL
834874	2010 VF_{156}	—	November 7, 2010	Mount Lemmon	Mount Lemmon Survey	·	600 m	MPC · JPL
834875	2010 VN_{157}	—	November 28, 2005	Mount Lemmon	Mount Lemmon Survey	·	1.8 km	MPC · JPL
834876	2010 VA_{166}	—	November 10, 2010	Mount Lemmon	Mount Lemmon Survey	EOS	1.3 km	MPC · JPL
834877	2010 VD_{170}	—	October 28, 2010	Kitt Peak	Spacewatch	·	2.0 km	MPC · JPL
834878	2010 VL_{174}	—	October 13, 2010	Mount Lemmon	Mount Lemmon Survey	·	1.4 km	MPC · JPL
834879	2010 VG_{175}	—	November 11, 2010	Kitt Peak	Spacewatch	·	1.4 km	MPC · JPL
834880	2010 VT_{177}	—	October 28, 2010	Mount Lemmon	Mount Lemmon Survey	·	1.5 km	MPC · JPL
834881	2010 VJ_{188}	—	November 13, 2010	Socorro	LINEAR	·	1.4 km	MPC · JPL
834882	2010 VA_{189}	—	November 13, 2010	Mount Lemmon	Mount Lemmon Survey	T_{j} (2.98) · 3:2	4.1 km	MPC · JPL
834883	2010 VE_{193}	—	November 3, 2010	Mount Lemmon	Mount Lemmon Survey	·	2.3 km	MPC · JPL
834884	2010 VQ_{197}	—	November 3, 2010	Mount Lemmon	Mount Lemmon Survey	T_{j} (2.99) · 3:2	3.8 km	MPC · JPL
834885	2010 VE_{199}	—	November 13, 2010	Mount Lemmon	Mount Lemmon Survey	·	840 m	MPC · JPL
834886	2010 VZ_{203}	—	November 4, 2010	Mount Lemmon	Mount Lemmon Survey	·	1.3 km	MPC · JPL
834887	2010 VH_{205}	—	September 17, 2003	Kitt Peak	Spacewatch	·	580 m	MPC · JPL
834888	2010 VT_{209}	—	November 2, 2010	Mount Lemmon	Mount Lemmon Survey	·	1.7 km	MPC · JPL
834889	2010 VM_{212}	—	November 6, 2010	Catalina	CSS	·	2.2 km	MPC · JPL
834890	2010 VQ_{214}	—	October 31, 2010	Kitt Peak	Spacewatch	·	1.5 km	MPC · JPL
834891	2010 VH_{215}	—	July 23, 2010	WISE	WISE	(895)	2.8 km	MPC · JPL
834892	2010 VM_{215}	—	September 16, 2010	Mount Lemmon	Mount Lemmon Survey	·	1.6 km	MPC · JPL
834893	2010 VH_{219}	—	September 16, 2010	Mount Lemmon	Mount Lemmon Survey	·	460 m	MPC · JPL
834894	2010 VL_{225}	—	September 21, 2009	Kitt Peak	Spacewatch	L4	6.0 km	MPC · JPL
834895	2010 VZ_{229}	—	July 12, 2010	WISE	WISE	(895)	3.1 km	MPC · JPL
834896	2010 VH_{232}	—	November 11, 2010	Mount Lemmon	Mount Lemmon Survey	·	1.6 km	MPC · JPL
834897	2010 VF_{234}	—	February 15, 2012	Haleakala	Pan-STARRS 1	·	2.3 km	MPC · JPL
834898	2010 VW_{234}	—	April 2, 2016	Mount Lemmon	Mount Lemmon Survey	·	740 m	MPC · JPL
834899	2010 VK_{235}	—	November 7, 2010	Mount Lemmon	Mount Lemmon Survey	·	530 m	MPC · JPL
834900	2010 VM_{235}	—	November 14, 2010	Mount Lemmon	Mount Lemmon Survey	·	2.2 km	MPC · JPL

== 834901–835000 ==
back to top

Designation			Discovery			Properties		Ref
Permanent	Provisional	Named after	Date	Site	Discoverer(s)	Category	Diam.	Ref
834901	2010 VP_{235}	—	July 27, 2010	WISE	WISE	·	2.0 km	MPC · JPL
834902	2010 VU_{235}	—	November 10, 2010	Kitt Peak	Spacewatch	·	490 m	MPC · JPL
834903	2010 VC_{236}	—	November 12, 2010	Mount Lemmon	Mount Lemmon Survey	·	500 m	MPC · JPL
834904	2010 VV_{236}	—	November 2, 2010	Mount Lemmon	Mount Lemmon Survey	·	2.4 km	MPC · JPL
834905	2010 VJ_{238}	—	November 3, 2010	Kitt Peak	Spacewatch	PHO	840 m	MPC · JPL
834906	2010 VY_{238}	—	July 28, 2014	Siding Spring	Kürti, S.	·	1.1 km	MPC · JPL
834907	2010 VB_{239}	—	August 1, 2010	WISE	WISE	·	1.7 km	MPC · JPL
834908	2010 VY_{239}	—	February 22, 2017	Mount Lemmon	Mount Lemmon Survey	·	1.6 km	MPC · JPL
834909	2010 VH_{240}	—	May 19, 2010	WISE	WISE	·	1.2 km	MPC · JPL
834910	2010 VK_{240}	—	March 10, 2016	Mount Lemmon	Mount Lemmon Survey	MAR	580 m	MPC · JPL
834911	2010 VU_{245}	—	November 12, 2010	Kitt Peak	Spacewatch	V	420 m	MPC · JPL
834912	2010 VO_{246}	—	February 29, 2016	Haleakala	Pan-STARRS 1	(5)	750 m	MPC · JPL
834913	2010 VR_{246}	—	November 14, 2010	Mount Lemmon	Mount Lemmon Survey	·	1.5 km	MPC · JPL
834914	2010 VG_{248}	—	August 19, 2001	Cerro Tololo	Deep Ecliptic Survey	T_{j} (2.98) · 3:2 · SHU	3.9 km	MPC · JPL
834915	2010 VU_{248}	—	July 14, 2013	Haleakala	Pan-STARRS 1	·	420 m	MPC · JPL
834916	2010 VU_{249}	—	November 6, 2010	Mount Lemmon	Mount Lemmon Survey	·	1.4 km	MPC · JPL
834917	2010 VK_{255}	—	November 10, 2010	Mount Lemmon	Mount Lemmon Survey	·	1.1 km	MPC · JPL
834918	2010 VM_{255}	—	November 13, 2010	Mount Lemmon	Mount Lemmon Survey	·	1.5 km	MPC · JPL
834919	2010 VO_{255}	—	November 2, 2010	Mount Lemmon	Mount Lemmon Survey	·	1.1 km	MPC · JPL
834920	2010 VK_{256}	—	November 4, 2010	Mount Lemmon	Mount Lemmon Survey	·	1.4 km	MPC · JPL
834921	2010 VV_{256}	—	November 1, 2010	Kitt Peak	Spacewatch	·	1.3 km	MPC · JPL
834922	2010 VJ_{257}	—	November 12, 2010	Mount Lemmon	Mount Lemmon Survey	·	1.2 km	MPC · JPL
834923	2010 VC_{258}	—	November 10, 2010	Mount Lemmon	Mount Lemmon Survey	·	2.3 km	MPC · JPL
834924	2010 VF_{258}	—	November 12, 2010	Mount Lemmon	Mount Lemmon Survey	·	1.5 km	MPC · JPL
834925	2010 VV_{258}	—	November 6, 2010	Mount Lemmon	Mount Lemmon Survey	EOS	1.4 km	MPC · JPL
834926	2010 VB_{259}	—	November 1, 2010	Mount Lemmon	Mount Lemmon Survey	·	1.2 km	MPC · JPL
834927	2010 VQ_{259}	—	November 12, 2010	Mount Lemmon	Mount Lemmon Survey	·	1.1 km	MPC · JPL
834928	2010 VT_{261}	—	November 14, 2010	Mount Lemmon	Mount Lemmon Survey	·	1.1 km	MPC · JPL
834929	2010 VB_{262}	—	November 6, 2010	Mount Lemmon	Mount Lemmon Survey	·	1.9 km	MPC · JPL
834930	2010 VU_{275}	—	November 2, 2010	Mount Lemmon	Mount Lemmon Survey	·	1.8 km	MPC · JPL
834931	2010 VR_{280}	—	November 14, 2010	Mount Lemmon	Mount Lemmon Survey	HNS	800 m	MPC · JPL
834932	2010 WX	—	November 1, 2010	Kitt Peak	Spacewatch	·	1.5 km	MPC · JPL
834933	2010 WG_{12}	—	October 13, 1999	Sacramento Peak	SDSS	·	800 m	MPC · JPL
834934	2010 WJ_{13}	—	November 26, 2010	Mount Lemmon	Mount Lemmon Survey	·	1.5 km	MPC · JPL
834935	2010 WW_{17}	—	November 14, 2010	Kitt Peak	Spacewatch	EOS	1.3 km	MPC · JPL
834936	2010 WN_{27}	—	October 14, 2010	Mount Lemmon	Mount Lemmon Survey	MAS	440 m	MPC · JPL
834937	2010 WO_{32}	—	November 27, 2010	Mount Lemmon	Mount Lemmon Survey	·	810 m	MPC · JPL
834938	2010 WD_{34}	—	November 27, 2010	Mount Lemmon	Mount Lemmon Survey	·	1.7 km	MPC · JPL
834939	2010 WP_{35}	—	November 27, 2010	Mount Lemmon	Mount Lemmon Survey	·	1.4 km	MPC · JPL
834940	2010 WQ_{36}	—	November 8, 2010	Kitt Peak	Spacewatch	THM	1.7 km	MPC · JPL
834941	2010 WY_{37}	—	November 8, 2010	Kitt Peak	Spacewatch	V	530 m	MPC · JPL
834942	2010 WC_{47}	—	November 27, 2010	Mount Lemmon	Mount Lemmon Survey	·	700 m	MPC · JPL
834943	2010 WP_{47}	—	November 6, 2010	Kitt Peak	Spacewatch	·	2.2 km	MPC · JPL
834944	2010 WO_{49}	—	November 10, 2010	Mount Lemmon	Mount Lemmon Survey	·	1.8 km	MPC · JPL
834945	2010 WO_{59}	—	January 26, 2006	Mount Lemmon	Mount Lemmon Survey	·	1.7 km	MPC · JPL
834946	2010 WY_{60}	—	February 2, 2006	Kitt Peak	Spacewatch	·	1.5 km	MPC · JPL
834947	2010 WK_{61}	—	November 27, 2010	Mount Lemmon	Mount Lemmon Survey	·	1.3 km	MPC · JPL
834948	2010 WJ_{62}	—	November 2, 2010	Kitt Peak	Spacewatch	·	2.6 km	MPC · JPL
834949	2010 WT_{64}	—	November 5, 2010	Kitt Peak	Spacewatch	·	1.8 km	MPC · JPL
834950	2010 WS_{67}	—	November 30, 2010	Mount Lemmon	Mount Lemmon Survey	·	2.2 km	MPC · JPL
834951	2010 WH_{68}	—	November 30, 2010	Mount Lemmon	Mount Lemmon Survey	·	1.1 km	MPC · JPL
834952	2010 WJ_{73}	—	September 20, 2003	Palomar	NEAT	·	520 m	MPC · JPL
834953	2010 WY_{75}	—	November 25, 2010	Mount Lemmon	Mount Lemmon Survey	·	920 m	MPC · JPL
834954	2010 WY_{78}	—	November 27, 2010	Mount Lemmon	Mount Lemmon Survey	·	1.2 km	MPC · JPL
834955	2010 WJ_{79}	—	November 27, 2010	Mount Lemmon	Mount Lemmon Survey	·	2.5 km	MPC · JPL
834956	2010 XO_{1}	—	October 7, 2004	Kitt Peak	Spacewatch	·	1.9 km	MPC · JPL
834957	2010 XK_{4}	—	December 2, 2010	Mount Lemmon	Mount Lemmon Survey	·	1.8 km	MPC · JPL
834958	2010 XR_{5}	—	October 21, 2006	Kitt Peak	Spacewatch	·	770 m	MPC · JPL
834959	2010 XD_{8}	—	December 2, 2010	Mount Lemmon	Mount Lemmon Survey	·	2.0 km	MPC · JPL
834960	2010 XM_{15}	—	December 2, 2010	Kitt Peak	Spacewatch	·	1.3 km	MPC · JPL
834961	2010 XQ_{23}	—	November 6, 2010	Mount Lemmon	Mount Lemmon Survey	·	470 m	MPC · JPL
834962	2010 XZ_{25}	—	October 1, 2005	Kitt Peak	Spacewatch	AGN	860 m	MPC · JPL
834963	2010 XQ_{27}	—	December 1, 2010	Mount Lemmon	Mount Lemmon Survey	·	1.4 km	MPC · JPL
834964	2010 XD_{29}	—	October 29, 1999	Kitt Peak	Spacewatch	MAS	490 m	MPC · JPL
834965	2010 XW_{29}	—	December 1, 2010	Mount Lemmon	Mount Lemmon Survey	·	1.6 km	MPC · JPL
834966	2010 XN_{36}	—	December 3, 2010	Kitt Peak	Spacewatch	3:2 · SHU	3.8 km	MPC · JPL
834967	2010 XE_{37}	—	December 3, 2010	Mount Lemmon	Mount Lemmon Survey	H	390 m	MPC · JPL
834968	2010 XB_{39}	—	December 3, 2010	Kitt Peak	Spacewatch	·	540 m	MPC · JPL
834969	2010 XP_{40}	—	November 12, 2010	Mount Lemmon	Mount Lemmon Survey	EOS	1.4 km	MPC · JPL
834970	2010 XB_{48}	—	October 12, 2010	Mount Lemmon	Mount Lemmon Survey	·	1.9 km	MPC · JPL
834971	2010 XT_{50}	—	October 1, 2005	Mount Lemmon	Mount Lemmon Survey	·	1.6 km	MPC · JPL
834972	2010 XA_{62}	—	December 21, 2006	Palomar	NEAT	·	1.1 km	MPC · JPL
834973	2010 XR_{63}	—	December 11, 2010	Mount Maidanak	A. V. Sergeyev, Y. N. Krugly	THM	1.6 km	MPC · JPL
834974	2010 XX_{63}	—	December 11, 2010	Mount Maidanak	A. V. Sergeyev, Y. N. Krugly	·	470 m	MPC · JPL
834975	2010 XS_{67}	—	December 3, 2010	Mount Lemmon	Mount Lemmon Survey	·	1.8 km	MPC · JPL
834976	2010 XE_{74}	—	November 13, 2010	Mount Lemmon	Mount Lemmon Survey	·	540 m	MPC · JPL
834977	2010 XF_{75}	—	December 2, 2010	Mount Lemmon	Mount Lemmon Survey	(5)	810 m	MPC · JPL
834978	2010 XN_{76}	—	December 3, 2010	Mount Lemmon	Mount Lemmon Survey	·	2.2 km	MPC · JPL
834979	2010 XT_{85}	—	December 6, 2010	Mount Lemmon	Mount Lemmon Survey	·	890 m	MPC · JPL
834980	2010 XA_{88}	—	December 13, 2010	Mount Lemmon	Mount Lemmon Survey	·	1.9 km	MPC · JPL
834981	2010 XC_{95}	—	January 20, 2015	Haleakala	Pan-STARRS 1	·	730 m	MPC · JPL
834982	2010 XM_{97}	—	August 15, 2013	Haleakala	Pan-STARRS 1	·	490 m	MPC · JPL
834983	2010 XB_{98}	—	January 17, 2010	WISE	WISE	LIX	2.5 km	MPC · JPL
834984	2010 XR_{98}	—	December 3, 2010	Mount Lemmon	Mount Lemmon Survey	·	1.9 km	MPC · JPL
834985	2010 XF_{99}	—	August 18, 2013	Haleakala	Pan-STARRS 1	·	540 m	MPC · JPL
834986	2010 XU_{99}	—	December 8, 2010	Mount Lemmon	Mount Lemmon Survey	·	1.8 km	MPC · JPL
834987	2010 XV_{102}	—	October 12, 2016	Mount Lemmon	Mount Lemmon Survey	·	660 m	MPC · JPL
834988	2010 XW_{103}	—	September 20, 2014	Haleakala	Pan-STARRS 1	BRA	900 m	MPC · JPL
834989	2010 XE_{106}	—	October 24, 2015	Mount Lemmon	Mount Lemmon Survey	EOS	1.4 km	MPC · JPL
834990	2010 XH_{106}	—	January 7, 2010	WISE	WISE	·	2.2 km	MPC · JPL
834991	2010 XC_{110}	—	December 14, 2010	Mount Lemmon	Mount Lemmon Survey	·	880 m	MPC · JPL
834992	2010 XL_{110}	—	December 3, 2010	Mount Lemmon	Mount Lemmon Survey	·	2.6 km	MPC · JPL
834993	2010 XU_{112}	—	December 13, 2010	Mount Lemmon	Mount Lemmon Survey	·	500 m	MPC · JPL
834994	2010 XQ_{113}	—	December 6, 2010	Mount Lemmon	Mount Lemmon Survey	·	2.4 km	MPC · JPL
834995	2010 XU_{115}	—	December 14, 2010	Mount Lemmon	Mount Lemmon Survey	EOS	1.5 km	MPC · JPL
834996	2010 XY_{115}	—	December 1, 2010	Mount Lemmon	Mount Lemmon Survey	·	2.0 km	MPC · JPL
834997	2010 XY_{120}	—	December 1, 2010	Mount Lemmon	Mount Lemmon Survey	·	1.2 km	MPC · JPL
834998	2010 XN_{121}	—	December 13, 2010	Mount Lemmon	Mount Lemmon Survey	(5)	810 m	MPC · JPL
834999	2010 XZ_{121}	—	December 2, 2010	Kitt Peak	Spacewatch	TIR	1.8 km	MPC · JPL
835000	2010 XW_{122}	—	December 2, 2010	Kitt Peak	Spacewatch	·	800 m	MPC · JPL

back to top
