= Margherita Hack =

Italian astrophysicist and science writer (1922–2013)

Margherita Hack OMCA Knight Grand Cross OMRI
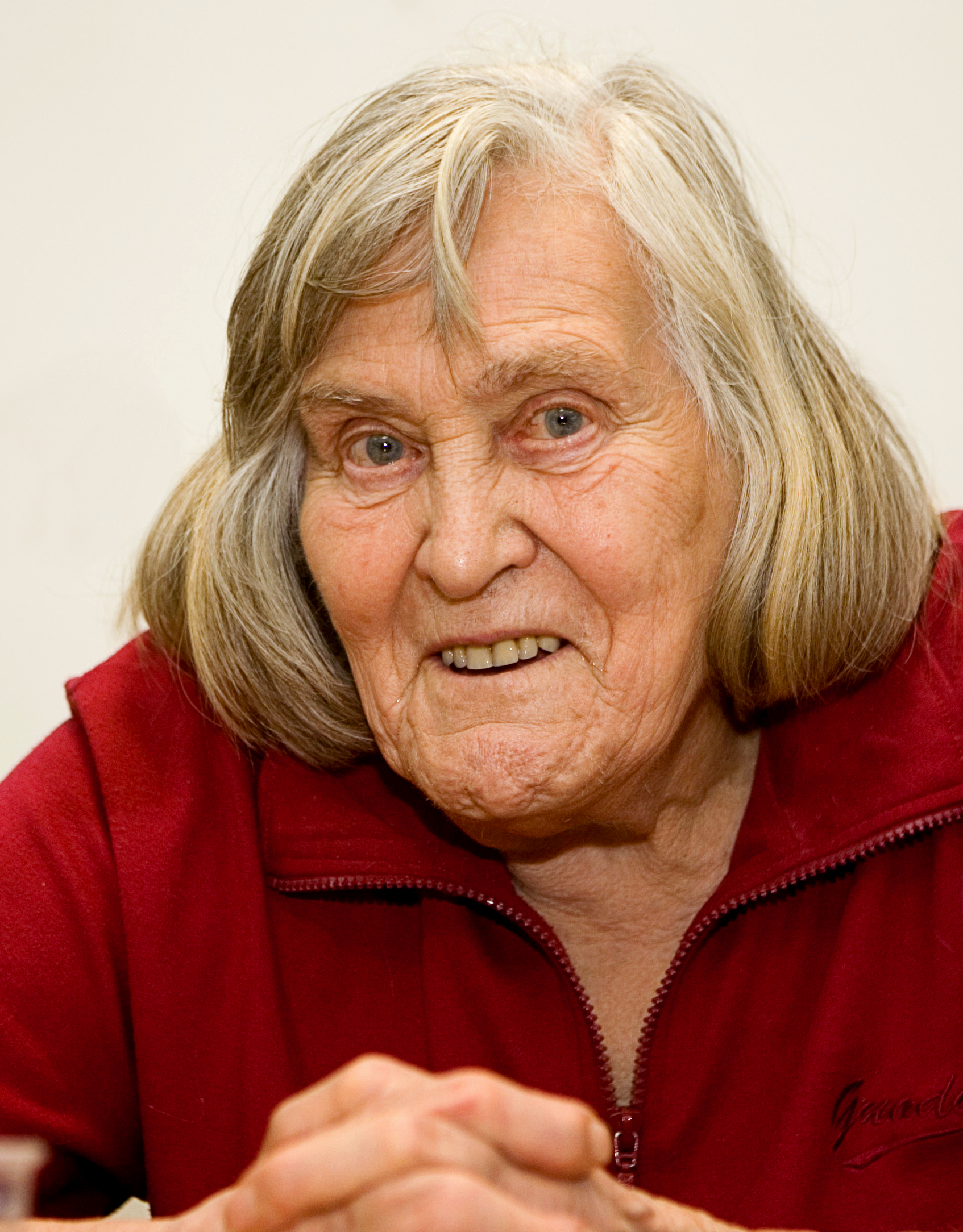
- Hack in 2006
- Born: 12 June 1922; Florence, Tuscany, Kingdom of Italy
- Died: 29 June 2013 (aged 91); Trieste, Friuli-Venezia Giulia, Italy
- Resting place: Cemetery of Sant'Anna, Trieste
- Education: University of Florence
- Spouse: Aldo De Rosa (m. 1944)
- Awards: Targa Giuseppe Piazzi (1994); Premio Internazionale Cortina Ulisse (1995)
- Scientific career
- Fields: Astrophysics; Popular science
- Workplaces: University of Trieste

Margherita Hack (Italian: [marɡeˈriːta ˈak]; 12 June 1922 – 29 June 2013) was an Italian astrophysicist and science communicator. The asteroid 8558 Hack, discovered in 1995, was named in her honour.

== Life and career ==
=== Personal life and education ===
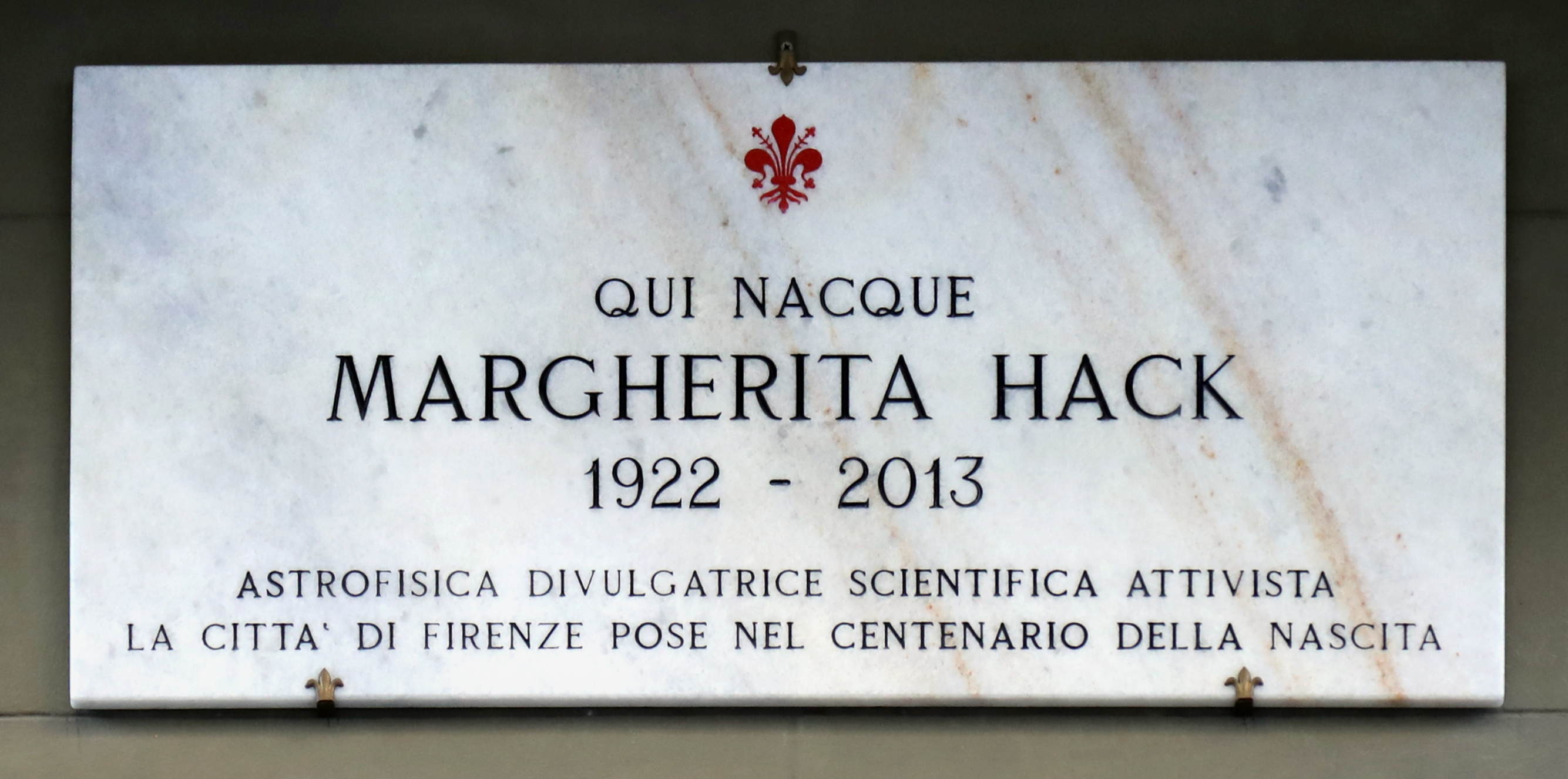
Commemorative plaque placed at Hack's birthplace in Florence on the 100th anniversary of her birth

Hack was born in Florence, Tuscany. Her father, Roberto Hack, was a Florentine bookkeeper of Protestant Swiss origin. Her mother, Maria Luisa Poggesi, a Tuscan Catholic, was a graduate of the Academy of Fine Arts of Florence and a miniaturist at the Uffizi Gallery. Both parents left their religion to join the Italian Theosophical Society, for which Roberto Hack was secretary for a time under the chairmanship of the countess Gamberini-Cavallini.

An athlete in her youth, Hack played basketball and competed in track and field during the National University Contests, called the Littoriali under Mussolini's fascist regime, where she won the long jump and the high jump events. She married Aldo De Rosa on 19 February 1944 in the church of San Leonardo in Arcetri; De Rosa had been one of her childhood playmates.

Hack attended the liceo classico "Galileo Galilei" in Florence, but the outbreak of World War II prevented her from taking her exams. In 1945, she received a degree in physics from the University of Florence with a final score of 101/110; her thesis in astrophysics was on Cepheid variables, based on her studies in the Arcetri Observatory, then under the direction of Giorgio Abetti. Hack considered Abetti her model for a scientist, teacher, and scientific research centre administrator.

In Italy, Hack was known for her anti-religious views and her continual criticism of the Catholic Church and of its hierarchy and institutions. She was a vegetarian from childhood and supported animal welfare. She wrote a book explaining this choice entitled Perché sono vegetariana (Why I Am a Vegetarian); she also wrote a book entitled La mia vita in bicicletta (My Life on a Bicycle).

Hack died on 29 June 2013 at 4:30 am at Cattinara Hospital in Trieste, Friuli-Venezia Giulia. She had been hospitalized for a week for heart problems, from which she had suffered for about two years. She had refused to have heart surgery. Hack's husband, Aldo De Rosa, died on 26 September 2014, due to complications of the Alzheimer disease. They both rest in the cemetery of Sant'Anna in Trieste. Hack left her personal library, containing 18,000 books on astronomy, to the city of Trieste.

=== Scientific activity ===
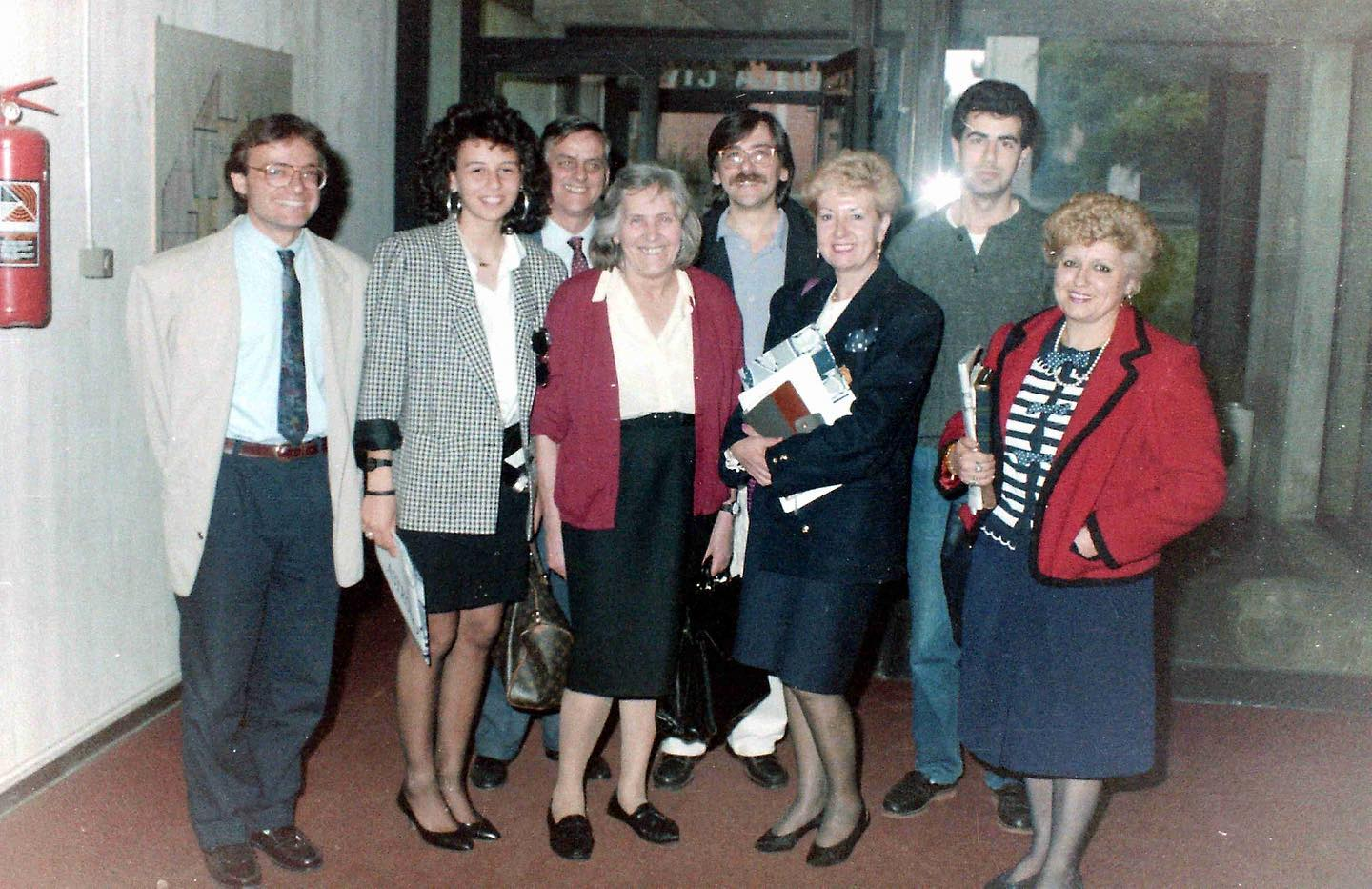
Hack hosted by the La Spezia association of amateur astronomers, 1989

She was full professor of astronomy at the University of Trieste from 1964 to 1 November 1992, when Hack was placed "out of role" for seniority. She has been the first Italian woman to administrate the Trieste Astronomical Observatory from 1964 to 1987, bringing it to international fame.

A member of several important physics and astronomy associations (International Astronomical Union, European Physical Society, Italian Astronomical Society, Italian Physical Society), Margherita Hack was also director of the Astronomy Department at the University of Trieste from 1985 to 1991 and from 1994 to 1997. She was a member of the Accademia Nazionale dei Lincei (national member in the class of mathematical physics and natural sciences; second category: astronomy, geodesic, geophysics and applications; section A: astronomy and applications). She worked at many American and European observatories and was for long time member of working groups of ESA and NASA. In Italy, with an intensive promotion work, she obtained the growth of activity of the astronomical community with access to several satellites, reaching a notoriety of international level.

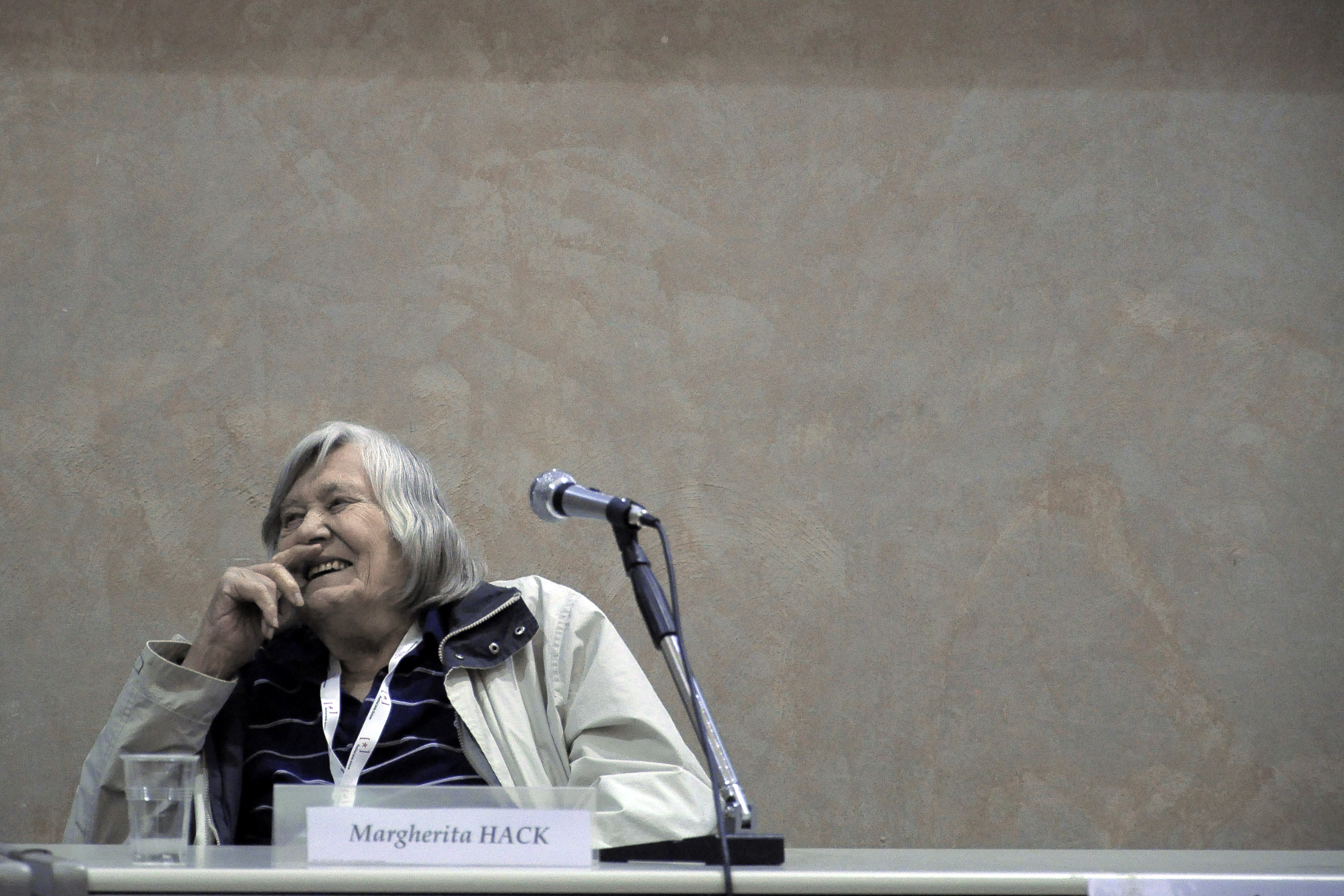
Hack at the 2011 Festival della Scienza in Genoa

Hack published several original papers in international journals and several books both of popular science and university level. In 1994 she was awarded with the Targa Giuseppe Piazzi for the scientific research, and in 1995 with the Cortina Ulisse Prize for scientific dissemination.

In 1978, Margherita Hack founded the bimonthly magazine L'Astronomia, whose first issue came out in November 1979; later, together with Corrado Lamberti, she directed the magazine of popular science and astronomy culture Le Stelle.

=== Social and political activity ===
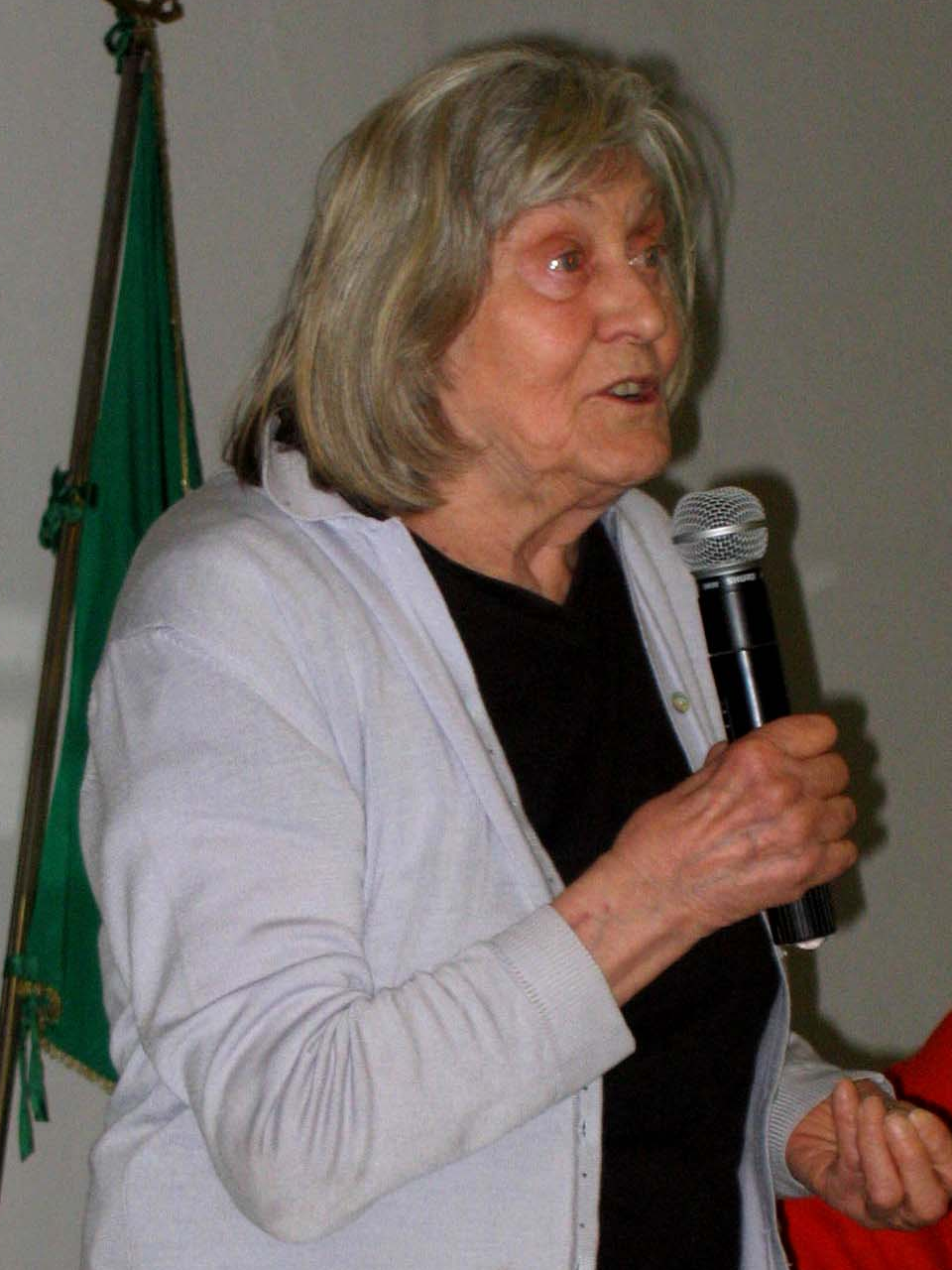
Margherita Hack on a UAAR conference in 2007

Hack was also known for her activities outside of science, especially in the social and political fields.

She was an atheist and she did not believe in any religion or form of supernaturalism. Hack also believed that ethics does not derive from religion, but from "principles of conscience" that allow anyone to have a secular view of life, respectful of other people's individuality and freedom.

Hostile to any form of superstition, including pseudosciences, Hack was a scientific guarantor of CICAP since 1989 and an honorary president of the Union of Rationalist Atheists and Agnostics (UAAR). In 2005, she joined Luca Coscioni Association for the freedom of scientific research. She has been a member of the Transnational Radical Party.

Hack stood for Italian regional elections of 2005 in Lombardy in the list of the Party of Italian Communists obtaining 5,364 votes in the province of Milan. After the election, she gave her seat to Bebo Storti. She sided again with the Party of Italian Communists in the 2006 Italian general election. She was nominated for several districts of the Chamber of Deputies, but she decided to give the seat up to devote herself to astronomy.

On 22 October 2008, during a student demonstration in Piazza della Signoria in Florence, Hack gave a lecture on astrophysics touching on the experiments carried out at the CERN about the Higgs boson, after a discussion against the law 133/08 (which previously was the law-decree 112, called "Tremonti decree"). On 21 January 2009 she became a candidate of the Anti-capitalist List for the European Elections of June. She wasn't elected because the list didn't reach the 4% threshold. In November 2009, through an open letter on the MicroMega magazine, she criticized Italian prime minister Silvio Berlusconi on the matter of legal actions in which he was involved in and his alleged attempt to elude them.

During the regional elections of 2010, Hack was running with the Federazione della Sinistra and she was elected in the Rome district with over 7000 votes. During the first Council meeting she resigned leaving the seat to the other list's candidates. In October 2012 she declared her endorsement for Nichi Vendola during the left wing primary elections, whereas during the following ballot she sided for Matteo Renzi against Pierluigi Bersani.

In April 2013, Hack joined the "Emma Bonino committee" together with other eminent Italian figures, such as Renzo Arbore, Toni Garrani, Anna Fendi, Alessandro Pace, Stefano Disegni to promote Emma Bonino's candidacy as Italian President of the Republic.

For more times, Hack was invited by and gave some lectures at the Grand Orient of Italy.

==== Supporting nuclear research ====
Regarding the energy issue, Margherita Hack spoke against the construction of nuclear power stations in Italy, but in favour of nuclear research, explaining that Italy was not at that time able to maintain nuclear reactors and that Italy is a scarcely reliable country.

== Artistic activity ==
Despite being far from the music world, Margherita Hack accepted a request from her friend, Roman singer-songwriter Stefano Pais, in 2006 to write the lyrics for the song "Questo è il mondo" (This Is the World), with which Pais aimed to participate in the following year's Sanremo Festival. The song was not selected for the final stage of the competition. Hack openly expressed her indifference to the outcome and the festival itself, leading to a live televised argument with Sanremo host and artistic director Pippo Baudo. The song was later recorded by Pais and is available on YouTube in a live performance.

In 2010, Hack appeared in the music video for "Alfonsina e la bici" (Alfonsina and the Bicycle) by the band Têtes de Bois, portraying the role of Alfonsina Strada, a pioneering female cyclist.

Between 2011 and 2012, she collaborated with singer Ginevra Di Marco on the concert-show L'anima della terra vista dalle stelle (The Soul of the Earth Seen from the Stars), where Hack narrated her experiences of the 20th century accompanied by Di Marco's music.

== Sports career ==
Margherita Hack
Personal information
- Home town: Florence, Italy
- Years active: 1940s

Sport
- Sport: High jump, long jump

In her youth, Margherita Hack demonstrated exceptional athletic talent. After a brief stint in basketball, she shifted to competitive athletics in the early 1940s. In 1941, she won gold in the high jump and long jump at the Littoriali in Florence. The following year, she earned gold in the high jump and bronze in the long jump at the Littoriali in Como. In 1942, she also secured bronze in the high jump at the Italian National Women's Championships.

=== National Championships ===
1940:

No rank at the Italian National Women's Championships, high jump

1941:

7th at the Italian National Women's Championships, high jump – 1.40 m

9th at the National Championships, long jump – 4.70 m

1942:

Bronze at the Italian National Women's Championships, high jump – 1.45 m

1943:

6th at the Italian National Women's Championships, high jump – 1.40 m

== Honours ==
=== Awards and decorations ===
| Knight Grand Cross of the Order of Merit of the Italian Republic – awarded on 28 May 2012 |

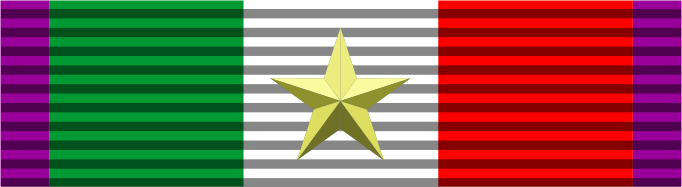
| Gold Medal of the Italian Order of Merit for Culture and Art – awarded on 27 May 1998 |

=== Tributes ===
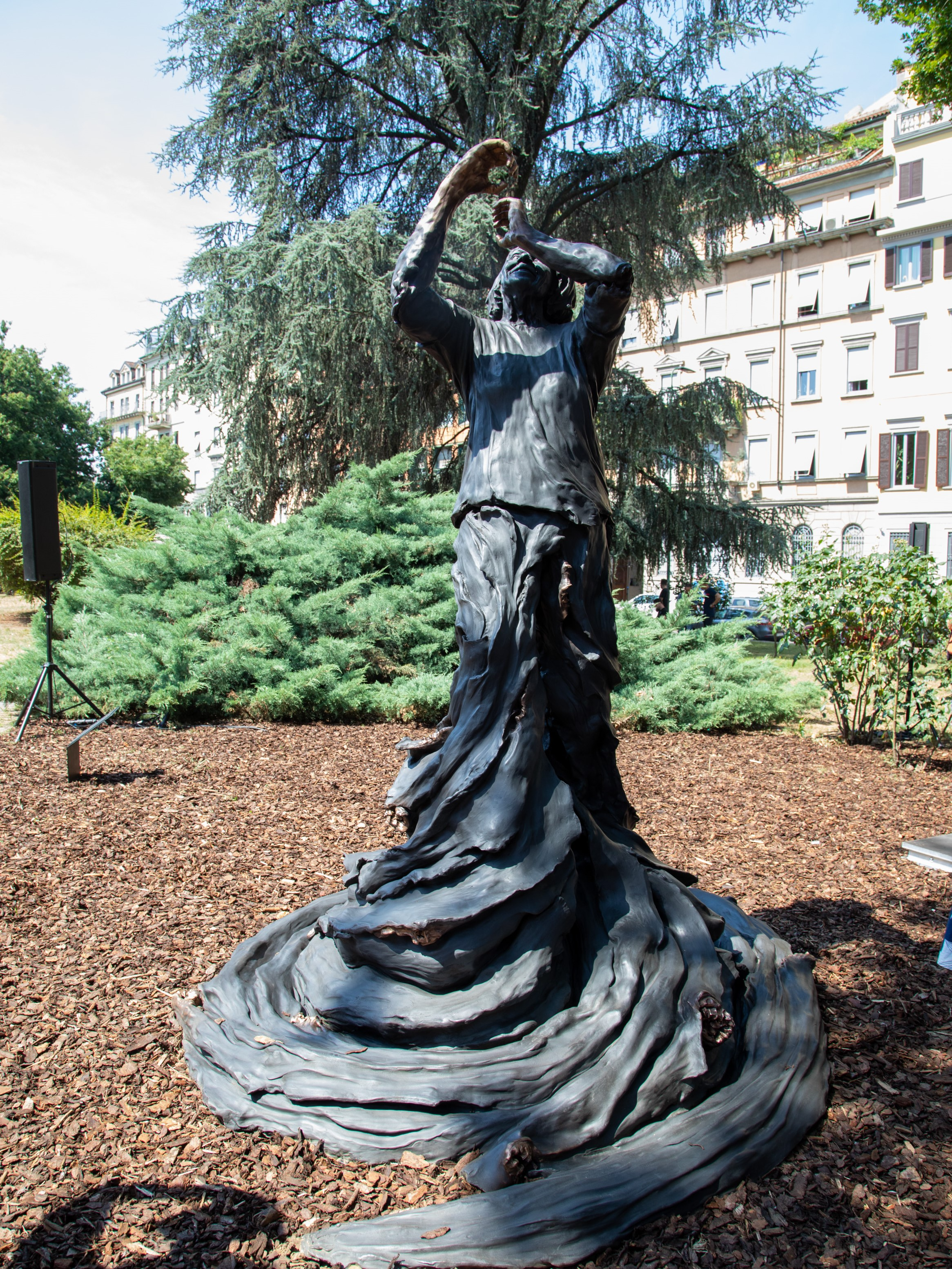
Sguardo Fisico, a sculpture representing Hack created by artist Sissi

On 12 June 2021, Google celebrated Hack with Google Doodle on her 99th birthday.

In June 2022, to celebrate the 100th anniversary of her birth, a statue of Margherita Hack was placed in front of the Università Statale di Milano. The bronze statue, titled Sguardo Fisico ("Physical Gaze"), is by the artist Daniela Olivieri (who is known as Sissi) – a teacher at the Academy of Fine Arts of Florence, where Hack's mother graduated. This is the first statue of a woman scientist to stand on public ground in Italy.

== Selected publications ==
- C'è qualcuno là fuori? (with Viviano Domenici, 2015)
- Hack! Come io vedo il mondo (2013)
- Nove vite come i gatti (with Federico Taddia, 2013)
- Vi racconto l'astronomia (2013)
- Il Mio Infinito (2011)
- La mia vita in bicicletta (2011)
- Perché sono vegetariana (2011)
- Dove nascono le stelle (2004)
- Nebulae and Galaxies (with Giorgio Abetti, 1964)
