= Valsecchi =

Valsecchi may refer to:

- Davide Valsecchi (born 1987), Italian racing driver
- Bagatti Valsecchi Museum, museum in Milan, Italy
- 3725 Valsecchi, main-belt asteroid
