= Baluardo a San Giorgio =

43°45′46.95″N 11°15′23.48″E

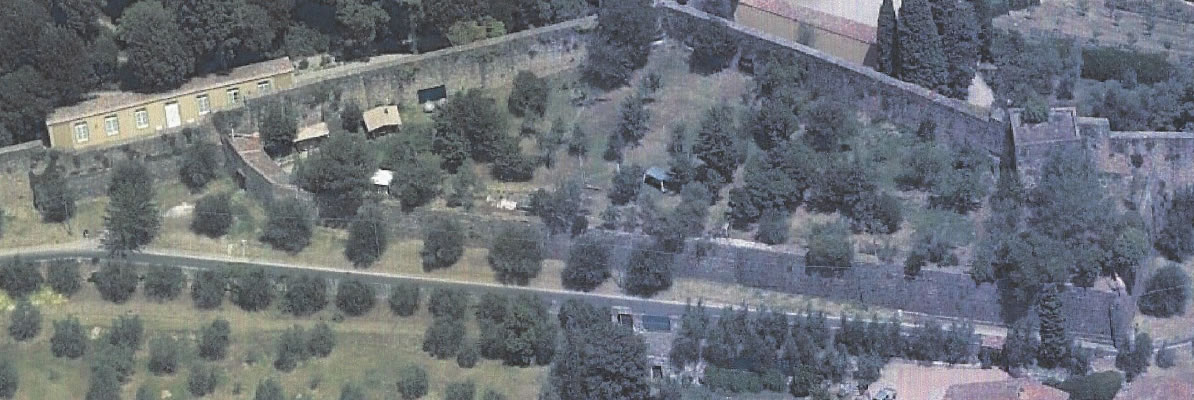
The bastion of San Giorgio, Firenze

The Baluardo a San Giorgio (English: bastion of San Giorgio) is a trapezoidal shaped enclosure that is part of a line of historic fortifications of the city of Florence. Located along the walls of Florence, near the Porta San Giorgio, in the south-west of the city, it is also known as the Baluardo della Ginevra, due to the presence at one time of a nearby spring called the Ginevra.

== History ==
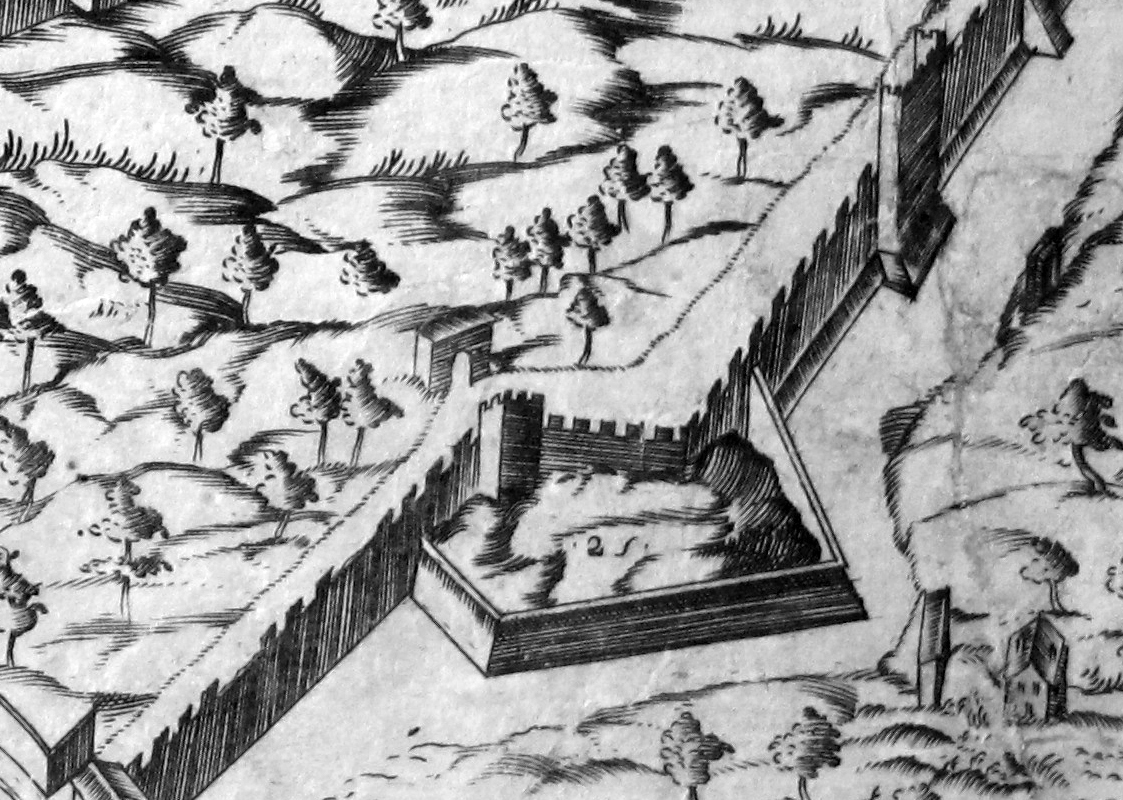
1584 map of Florence by Stefano Buonsignori, detail of Baluardo a San Giorgio

The rampart abuts a section of the medieval city walls that from the Porta San Giorgio descends to that of San Miniato. This stretch belongs to the circle of 1258, as the Porta San Giorgio, which is the oldest of those still preserved in the city. This section of the walls was reviewed and restored, but not essentially altered at the time of the construction of the last circle from the late '200 and early' 300.

The Baluardo a San Giorgio was built at the behest of Cosimo I de' Medici, Grand Duke of Tuscany in 1544 on one of the ramparts designed by Michelangelo Buonarroti during the siege of Florence in 1529–30. The idea to build a fortress in this location was already proposed by Niccolò Machiavelli. The current bulwark is part of a massive effort to upgrade the city's military, together with other strongholds, now largely disappeared, which aimed to reinforce some key points along the medieval walls of the city.

The bulwark encompasses one of the towers and a section of the heavily angled walls themselves; some artillery emplacements are preserved here, cut into the medieval wall during construction of Michelangelo's bastion.

== Modern times ==
The area, property of the Commune of Florence, is now the headquarters and shooting range of the Balestrieri Fiorentini, the Florentine Crossbowmen who participate in the Procession of the Calcio Storico Fiorentino. The Balestrieri Fiorentini look after the maintenance of the bulwark, preserving it as it has been handed down through history.

The Palio is a traditional Florentine festival that includes a shooting competition from the distance of 25 meters with traditional crossbows, in which eight companies of archers participate. Dressed in medieval clothing, these competitors are from various towns of Tuscany, Marche, Romagna and Abruzzo.

== Bibliography ==
- Anichini, Luca. Alle porte con i sassi: storia e guida alle porte delle mura di Firenze, Nicomp, Firenze, 2010.
- Artusi, Luciano. Le antiche porte di Firenze. Alla scoperta delle mura che circondavano la città, edizione SEMPER, Firenze, 2005.
- Machiavelli, Niccolò. "Relazione di una visita fatta per fortificare Firenze", in Arte della Guerra e scritti politici minori, a cura di Sergio Bertelli, 1961.
- Manetti, Renzo. Michelangiolo: le fortificazioni per l’assedio di FirenzeLibreria editrice fiorentina, Firenze, 1980.
- Rinaldi, Alessandro. Sul limitare della città: Storia e vita delle mura urbane a Firenze tra Seicento e Ottocento Edifir. Ente Cassa di Risparmio di Firenze, 2008.
