= Bagatti =

Bagatti is a surname. Notable people with the name include:

- Bellarmino Bagatti (1905 – 1990), 20th-century Italian archaeologist and Catholic priest of the Franciscan Order
- Romano Bagatti
- Sergio Bagatti

== See also ==
- Bugatti (surname)
- Bagatti Valsecchi Museum
