= Corrado Lamberti =

Italian astrophysicist (1947–2020)

Corrado Lamberti (6 May 1947 – 17 April 2020) was an Italian astrophysicist, science journalist and teacher. He was one of the most appreciated popularizers of astronomy in Italy, and along with Margherita Hack he headed the astronomy magazines L'Astronomia and Le Stelle.

== Biography ==
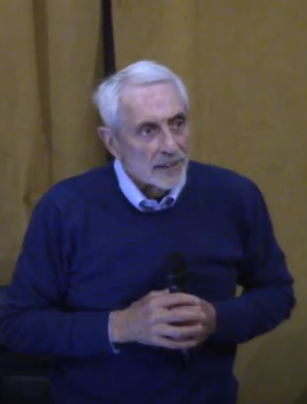
Lamberti in 2018

Lamberti, born in Lenno in 1947, graduated in Physics in 1972 at the University of Milan, in the same class as Giuseppe Occhialini, with a thesis on cosmic physics. During his university years, he also stood out for his political activism. He taught physics in many high schools in the Como area, and in 1979 he was the founder, along with Margherita Hack, of the magazine L'Astronomia, of which he was editor, deputy director and finally managing director until June 2002. In November 2002, again with Margherita Hack, he founded a new magazine for astronomical popularization, Le Stelle, of which he was director until March 2008. He contributed to the Italian edition of numerous books of scientific studies for Italian and international publishing houses.

Lamberti returned to the limelight of political commitment, in his region, in 2008, when he was one of the founders of the association La cruna del lago, a non-partisan group that fights against the overbuilding of the coast of Lake Como. The association achieved considerable popularity in the summer of 2008, with a continuous presence in newspapers and local media, thanks to a counter-information campaign that led to the withdrawal of overbuilding initiatives on the promontory of Lavedo, near Villa Balbianello in Lenno.

He died on 17 April 2020, aged 72, at the General Area Hospital Moriggia Pelascini of Gravedona, of COVID-19 during the pandemic in Italy.

== Career and works ==
Lamberti authored over a thousand articles concerning astrophysics, particle physics, astronautics, as well as the history and epistemological aspects of astronomy, published in magazines and newspapers. He held extra-curricular courses in astrophysics, cosmology, particle physics for students of various high schools in Como.

He collaborated on the Italian edition of Cambridge Encyclopedia: Astronomy (Laterza), writing the updates of the two editions of 1981 and 1989.

He was author of an encyclopedic dictionary of astronomy (G. E. Jackson, 1987), and directed the work Astronomia, dalla Terra ai confini dell'universo (Astronomy, from the Earth to the edge of the universe; 10 volumes, Fabbri Ed., 1991 and 1995), which was translated into Spanish, French and Portuguese. He also directed a Course of Astronomy (6 vols., ERI - Fabbri, 1984), the work Viaggio nell'universo (Voyage in the Universe 33 monographs, RCS, 2001) and the series of books Le Stelle (The Stars) published by Springer Verlag Italy-Gruppo B Edit.

For Springer Italia he published in 2011 the book Capire l'universo (Understanding the universe), a popular text on the history and the most recent discoveries in the field of cosmology.

For Aliberti Editore he published in 2012 the book Il bosone di Higgs: il trionfo del Modello Standard o l'alba di una nuova fisica?, in which, drawing inspiration from the historic discovery of the Higgs boson announced at CERN in Geneva on 4 July 2012, he traced the entire history of particle physics, culminating in the construction of the Standard Model of elementary particles. In 2015 he published a new (expanded) edition of the book for Imprimatur Editore: Il bosone di Higgs: dopo il trionfo del Modello Standard spunterà l'alba di una nuova fisica?.

In October 2014 he published La battaglia di Tremezzina, a short history of the Resistance in the area of central Lario, reconstructed on the basis of documents and memories handed down to him by his father Carlo, who had fought with the 52nd Garibaldi Brigade "Luigi Clerici", the partisan group which, in April 1945, arrested Benito Mussolini and other Fascist hierarchs near Dongo.

In June 2016 Lamberti published Viva Margherita (Sperling & Kupfer), an affectionate memoir of his thirty-year association, for friendship and for work, with Margherita Hack and her husband Aldo De Rosa, as well as an autobiography describing the author's relationships with protagonists of physics, astronomy, and science popularization in Italy.

== Awards ==
- In 1989 he was awarded the A. Kastler - Città di Trieste Prize for science journalism.
- In 1998 he was awarded the Targa Piazzi Award from the Palermo province for the popularization of astronomy.
- In 1999, the International Astronomical Union honored him "for the merits acquired in twenty years of activity in the dissemination of astronomical knowledge in Italy" by naming asteroid 6206 Corradolamberti after him.
- In 2013 he was awarded the GAL Hassin Prize for science journalism and he was made an honorary citizen of Isnello.
- in 2015 he was awarded the "G. B. Lacchini" Award by the Italian Amateur Astronomers Union, for his work in science popularization.
- he has been included in Who's Who in the World, Who's Who in Finance and Industry and Dictionary of International Biography.
