= Lorenzo di Niccolò =

Italian painter

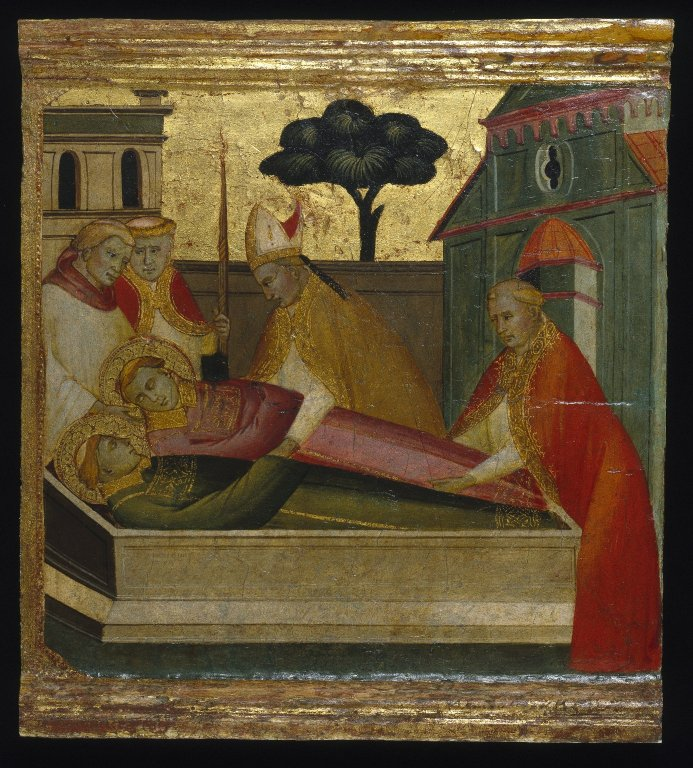
Lorenzo di Niccolò, The Martyrdom of Saint Lawrence, 1412, Tempera and tooled gold on poplar panel, 12 7/8 x 14 3/16 in. (32.7 x 36 cm), Brooklyn Museum

Lorenzo di Niccolò or Lorenzo di Niccolò di Martino was an Italian painter who was active in Florence from 1391 to 1412. This early Renaissance artist worked in the Trecento style, and his work maintains influences of the Gothic style, marking a transitional period between the Gothic sensibilities of the Middle Ages while simultaneously beginning to draw on the Classical. Lorenzo's works were usually religious scenes in tempera with gold backgrounds.

== Education and personal life ==
The exact year of Lorenzo's birth is unknown, but should be approximately 1374, for the first recorded date of his existence is in 1392 when it is documented that Lorenzo and his mentor, Niccolò di Pietro Gerini, painted frescoes in the church of San Francesco at Pisa. Lorenzo is often erroneously cited as the son of Niccolò di Pietro Gerini because he completed some works with the painter, and Lorenzo's work is stylistically similar to Gerini's. It is more likely that Lorenzo was simply trained in Gerini's workshop; therefore, many of Lorenzo's early works share similarities with the work of Gerini. Lorenzo's education was limited, as it is thought that he trained under Gerini in a bottega, and in a way that was not conducive to learning the highest levels of painting. Gerini's work focused more on managing many artists on large projects than on working as a skilled painter. Lorenzo's friend, painter Spinello Aretino, was more influential to Lorenzo's personal artistic development. Lorenzo drew inspiration from Spinello's large-scale frescos and the freedom of imagination in his works. Lorenzo's work was further influenced by Lorenzo Monaco, and to a greater extent by Mariotto di Nardo and Andrea di Giusto. Based on records, Lorenzo was a most likely a member of the Medici e Speziali guild around 1408, and was certainly a member of the Compagnia di San Luca in 1410.

Lorenzo had a son, Piero, who was trained in painting at the Arte dei Medici e Speziali in 1422 and became a painter in his own right. At this time, Lorenzo had already died.

== Career ==
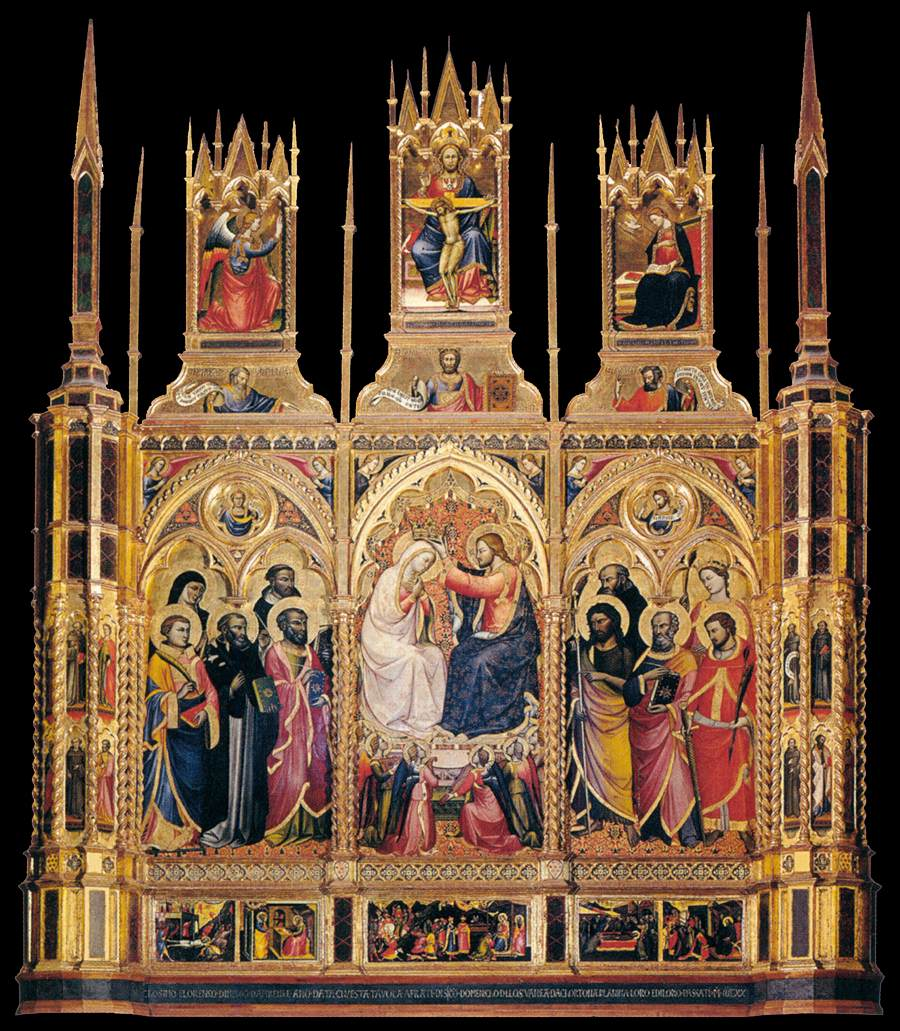
Lorenzo di Martino, Coronation of the Virgin, 1402, tempera and gold on panel, 81.9 x 102.8 in (208 x 261 cm), SanS Domenico, Cortona

Throughout his career, Lorenzo maintained Trecento traditions in his work, a style that he learned from Gerini. Lorenzo's works, such as S. Giovanni and his enemy before the crucifix in Saint Miniato, serve as defining models of Florentine art's transitional period at the beginning of the 15th century and connect the artist to the Florentine art circle and continued to work in a form of the late Gothic style well into the 15th century. This particular circle of Proto-Renaissance style Florentine artists was centered around artist Lorenzo Monaco. Although the Trecento period had technically ended by Lorenzo's time, this circle of artists continued to work in the style, which bridged the gap between the artistic styles of the Gothic and Renaissance periods. Many of Lorenzo di Niccolò's works focus on his use of decorative patterns, and do not seem to be concerned with the classicizing naturalistic intentions of the majority of Renaissance artists working in 15th century Florence. However, when compared with his contemporary, Mariotto di Nardo, it is clear that Lorenzo skillfully maintained a Gothic style while allowing his figures some sense of movement that does not exist in works by Mariotto di Nardo.

The first surviving work that can be attributed to Lorenzo is a triptych of St Bartholomew Enthroned, with Scenes from his Life. In 1401, Lorenzo collaborated with his mentor, Gerini, and friend Spinello Aretino on an altarpiece entitled Coronation of the Virgin for Saint Felicita in Florence. Lorenzo's addition to this altarpiece was limited to the four saints on the left side of the predella. However, in January 1402 Lorenzo was commissioned to paint his own altarpiece of the Coronation of the Virgin, a polyptych for the predella of San Marco in Florence. In 1440, Cosimo and Lorenzo de' Medici had this altarpiece removed and replaced with a work by Fra Angelico, and Lorenzo's altarpiece was subsequently moved to San Domenico at Cortona.

As he matured, Lorenzo's style transformed from one reminiscent of Giotto's style to a more elegant and linear style that was more in line with the works of artists such as Lorenzo Monaco. Together with Niccolò di Pietro Gerini, Lorenzo painted some frescoes in the Chapterhouse of the convent of San Francesco (Prato) and the panel Coronation of the Virgin, once in Santa Felicita. Lorenzo carried the subject of Coronation of the Virgin into his work for the Medici Chapel in Santa Croce, Florence. This work, completed in 1409, can be found in the chapel's predella. Today, Lorenzo's painting for the Medici Chapel is split between its original location and the Bagatti Valsecchi Museum in Milan. Lorenzo's painting of the Madonna and Child Enthroned with Sts. Christopher, Blaise, Sebastian, and Francis (c. 1410–1412) is now exhibited in the St Louis Museum of Art. Furthermore, two salvers at the Metropolitan Museum of Art were attributed to the Studio of Lorenzo di Niccolò by art historians Elizabeth Gardner and Federico Zeri. It has been proposed that the subject of these salvers is a story from Boccaccio's Comedia delle Ninfe Fiorentine. The last dated work that is attributed to Lorenzo is Virgin and Child with Saints, a polyptych in Saint Lorenzo a Collina at Mezzomonte from 1412.

=== S. Giovanni Gualberto and his Enemy Before the Crucifix in S. Miniato ===
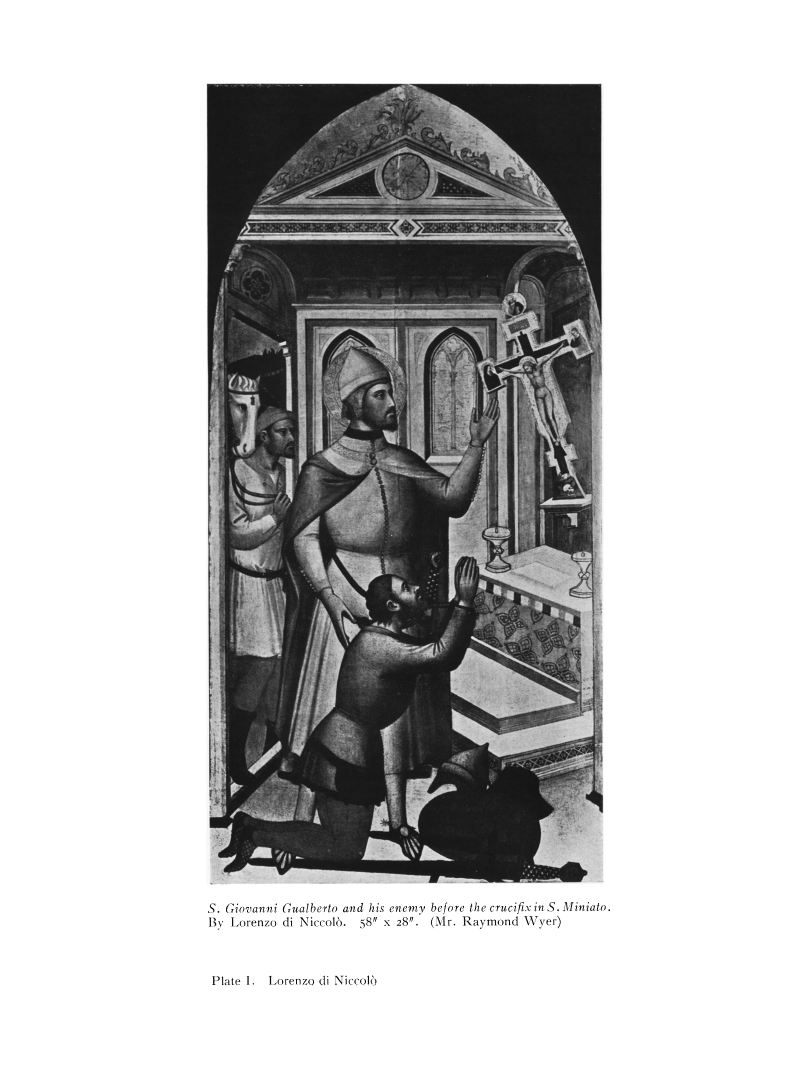
Lorenzo di Niccolò, S. Giovanni Gualberto and his enemy before the crucifix in S. Miniato, 58 x 28 in

S. Giovanni Gualberto and his enemy before the Crucifix in S. Miniato is emblematic of proto-renaissance art through its decorative pattern and denial of modern Quattrocento naturalism. Aspects of the stylization of this painting are characteristic of Lorenzo's other works, seen through angular figures, large hands, and bright colors. In colour, the work features bright colours, with blue, red and yellow tones and a light-green background. The work depicts a popular legend of an 11th-century Florentine nobleman, and was a typical subject for late Trecento period and early Quattrocento artists. Here San Giovanni Gualberto and his enemy are in the church of San Miniato al Monte, which is outside of Florence. According to the legend, Giovanni Gualberto set out to kill the knight who had killed his brother, but when Giovanni confronted the knight, it was Good Friday and the knight was unarmed. Giovanni's enemy then knelt before him and begged for mercy in the name of the Crucified. Guivanni Gualberto proceeded to put down his sword and enter the church with the knight. Through his work, Lorenzo places a halo around Giovanni's head to reveal the moment that the crucifix in the church bowed as a symbol of approval of Giovanni's lack of violence, and the enemies continued to become friends. Lorenzo's depiction of this miracle veers from the traditional legend through the existence of the knight's weapons, which he has laid at his side.

== Market ==
Seven auction results for sales of Lorenzo's work between January 1998 and October 2016 are a matter of public record through ArtNet. These works, mostly consisting of tempera on panel, have generally sold far beyond their estimated prices. Lorenzo's works have ultimately sold between $40,250 and $870,596 based on these public records.

== Major works ==
- S. Bartholomew Enthroned and four Scenes from his Legend (Palazzo Communal, San Gimignano)
- S. Giovanni Gualberto and his Enemy Before the Crucifix in S. Miniato (Worcester, Mass.)
- Altarpiece of Saint Felicità, Coronation of the Virgin
- Saint Bartholomew Enthroned, with Scenes from his Life, 1402 (San Marco, Venice)
- Virgin and Child with Saints, 1412 (Saint Lorenzo a Collina at Mezzomonte)
- Virgin and Child with Saints,, triptych (San Leonardo in Arcetri, Florence)
- Altarwing, S. Niccolò and S. Giovanni Gualberto
- Madonna Seated on Clouds; Four Saints Standing Below (Museum of Fine Arts, Boston)
- Madonna Seated on a Cushion (Christ Church Library, Oxford)
- Small Madonna (Museo Civico, Pisa)
- S. John the Baptist, S. James and S. Anthony, right wing of a triptych (Museo Civico, Pisa)
- Madonna between S. Nicholas and S. Laurence, 1402 (San Martino, Terenzano)
- Madonna and Child Enthroned with Sts. Christopher, Blaise, Sebastian, and Francis, 1410-1412 (St. Louis Museum of Art)
- The Martyrdom of Saint Lawrence, 1412 (Brooklyn Museum, New York)

== Bibliography ==
- Lettere di un notaro a un mercante [F. Datini] del secolo XIV, con altre lettere, a cura di C. Guasti, II, Firenze 1880, pp. 395 s., 401–408
- G. Milanesi, Nuovi documenti per la storia dell'arte toscana, Firenze 1901, p. 70, n. 88
- O. Sirén, «L. di N. Gerini», in The Burlington Magazine, XXXVI (1920), pp. 72–78
- R. Van Marle, The Development of the Italian Schools of Painting, III, The Hague 1924, pp. 632–646
- D. E. Colnaghi, A Dictionary of Florentine Painters from the 13th to the 17th Centuries, London 1928, pp. 162 s.
- R. Offner, «The Mostra del Tesoro di Firenze sacra II», in The Burlington Magazine, LXIII (1933), p. 169
- B. Berenson, Italian Pictures of the Renaissance. Florentine School, I, London 1963, pp. 121–124
- U. Baldini, La cappella Migliorati nel S. Francesco di Prato, Prato 1965, pp. 32, 45 n. 5
- B. Cole, «A New Work by the Young L. di N.», in The Art Quarterly, XXXIII (1970), pp. 114–119
- M. Boskovits, Pittura fiorentina alla vigilia del Rinascimento 1370-1400, Firenze 1975, passim
- R. Fremantle, Florentine Gothic Painters from Giotto to Masaccio, London 1975, pp. 391–400
- E. Fahy, «On L. di N.», in Apollo, CVIII (1978), pp. 374–381
- A. M. M. Gealt, L. di N., diss., University Microfilms International, Ann Arbor (MI) 1981
- A. Tartuferi, «Spinello Aretino in S. Michele Visdomini a Firenze (e alcune osservazioni su L. di N.)», in Paragone, XXXIV (1983), 395, pp. 4–9, 14–18
- Dipinti toscani e oggetti d'arte dalla Collezione Vittorio Cini, a cura di F. Zeri, M. Natale, A. Mottola Molfino, Vicenza 1984, pp. 9 s.
- E. Biagi, in La pittura in Italia. Il Duecento e il Trecento, II, Milano 1985, p. 592
- A. M. Maetzke, in Il polittico di L. di N. della chiesa di S. Domenico in Cortona dopo il restauro (catal.), Cortona 1986, pp. 5–8
- F. Zeri, La Collezione Federico Mason Perkins, Torino 1988, p. 24
- A. Angelini, in Antichi maestri pittori. Quindici anni di studi e ricerche (catal.), a cura di G. Romano, Torino 1993, pp. 83–85
- M. Sframeli, «Il monastero di S. Verdiana a Firenze nel Quattrocento, II. La decorazione pittorica», in Antichità viva, XXXII (1994), 1, p. 29
- L. B. Kanter, Italian Paintings in the Museum of Fine Arts, Boston, I, 13th-15th Century, Boston 1994, pp. 128–130
- O. Casazza, «La Maestà dell'antica residenza dell'arte della seta in palazzo di Parte guelfa a Firenze», in Critica d'arte, LVIII (1995), p. 70
- J. Richards, in The Dictionary of Art, XIX, New York 1996, p. 678
- S. Weppelmann, Spinello Aretino und die toskanische Malerei des 14. Jahrhunderts, Firenze 2003, pp. 69, 71, 161, 276–279, 369 s.
- Stefano Pierguidi, voce LORENZO di Niccolo (Lorenzo di Niccolo Gerini), in Dizionario Biografico degli Italiani, 66, Roma 2006.
