= Bugatti (disambiguation) =

Bugatti was a French car manufacturer of high-performance automobiles.

Bugatti may also refer to:

- Bugatti Automobiles S.A.S., a brand revival active from 1998 to the present, a subsidiary of Groupe VOLKSWAGEN France s.a.
- Bugatti (surname), a surname
- "Bugatti" (song), a song by American hip-hop artist Ace Hood
- "Bugatti", a song by Tiga (musician)
- Bugatti Circuit, permanent race track in France
