= Bugatti (surname) =

Bugatti is a surname. Notable people with the name include:

- Carlo Bugatti (1856–1940), designer and cabinetmaker
- Ettore Bugatti (1881–1947), founder of Bugatti, son of Carlo
- Giovanni Battista Bugatti (1779–1869), official executioner for the Papal States from 1796 to 1865
- Jean Bugatti (1909–1939), automotive designer and test engineer, eldest son of Ettore Bugatti
- Roland Bugatti (1922–1977), automobile executive, son of Ettore Bugatti
- Rembrandt Bugatti (1884–1916), sculptor, son of Carlo

== See also ==
- Bagatti
- Bugatti (disambiguation)
