= Bagatti Valsecchi Museum =

Historic house museum in Montenapoleone, Milan, Italy

Coordinates: 45°28′00″N 9°10′00″E

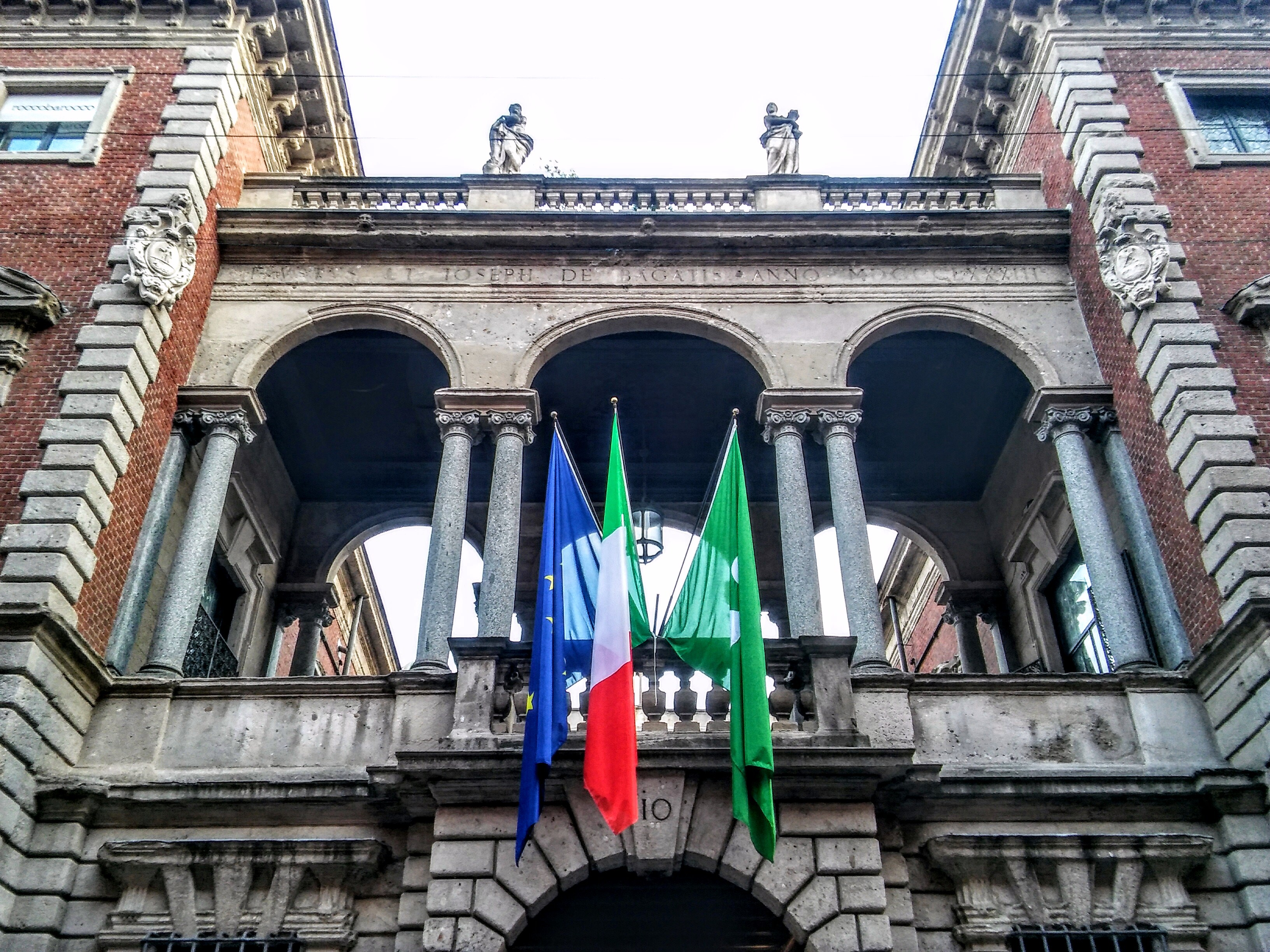
- Facade of Bagatti Valsecchi
- Established: Non-profit private foundation, founded in 1974, and open to the public since 1994
- Location: Milan
- Director: Pier Fausto Bagatti Valsecchi
- Website: www.museobagattivalsecchi.org and www.bagattivalsecchi.house.museum

The Bagatti Valsecchi Museum is a historic house museum in the Montenapoleone district of downtown Milan, northern Italy.

The Bagatti Valsecchi Museum's permanent collections principally contain Italian Renaissance decorative arts (such as maiolica, furniture, tapestry, metalwork, leather, glassware and precious table-top coffers made of ivory, or “stucco and pastiglia”), some sculptures (including a Madonna and Child lunette by a follower of Donatello), and many paintings. European Renaissance weapons, armor, clocks and a few textiles and scientific and musical instruments complete the collection assembled by the Barons Bagatti Valsecchi, and displayed in their home, as per their wishes.

== Paintings ==
The Bagatti Valsecchi Museum, although originally intended as a private home, not a gallery, has an interesting collection of Italian Renaissance paintings. A few are from the Trecento/14th century and the Seicento/17th century, but most date to the Quattrocento/15th century, or the Cinquecento/16th century. They include:

- S. Giustina de’ Borromeis, Giovanni Bellini, c. 1475
- Beatified Lorenzo Giustiniani, Gentile Bellini, c. 1470, in its original frame
- Christ in Majesty, Virgin, Christ Child and Saints, Giovanni Pietro Rizzoli, aka Giampietrino, 1540s (painter inspired by Leonardo da Vinci)
- S. Francis, S. John the Baptist, Bernardo Zenale, c. 1507 (painter inspired by Leonardo da Vinci)
- S. Francis and S. Mary Magdalen; the Prophet Isaiah, Lorenzo di Niccolò, active in Florence between 1391 and 1412, originally found in the Medici Chapel of Santa Croce, Florence
- Four allegorical figures, Andrea Lilio, oil on canvas, 1640s

== DEMHIST ==
The Bagatti Valsecchi Museum, home to DEMHIST, ICOM's International Committee for Historic House Museums from its founding in 1998 until the end of the board's first triennial in 2002, continues to support activities geared to furthering our understanding of this kind of museum.
