= San Leonardo in Arcetri =

Roman Catholic church in Florence, Italy

Coordinates: 43.759913°N 11.255107°E

Church of Saint Leonard in Arcetri (Chiesa di San Leonardo in Arcetri)
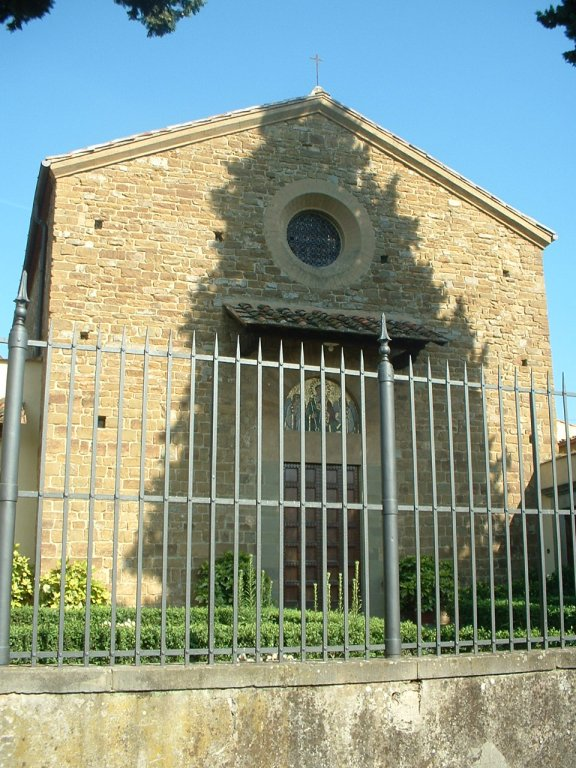
- Façade of the church.

Religion
- Affiliation: Roman Catholic
- Province: Florence

Location
- Location: Florence, Italy
- Interactive map of Church of Saint Leonard in Arcetri (Chiesa di San Leonardo in Arcetri)

Architecture
- Type: Church
- Style: Romanesque
- Groundbreaking: 11c

San Leonardo in Arcetri is a Romanesque-style, Roman Catholic church located on Via di San Leonardo #25, a few hundred meters southeast of the Porta San Giorgio of Florence, Italy.

== History ==
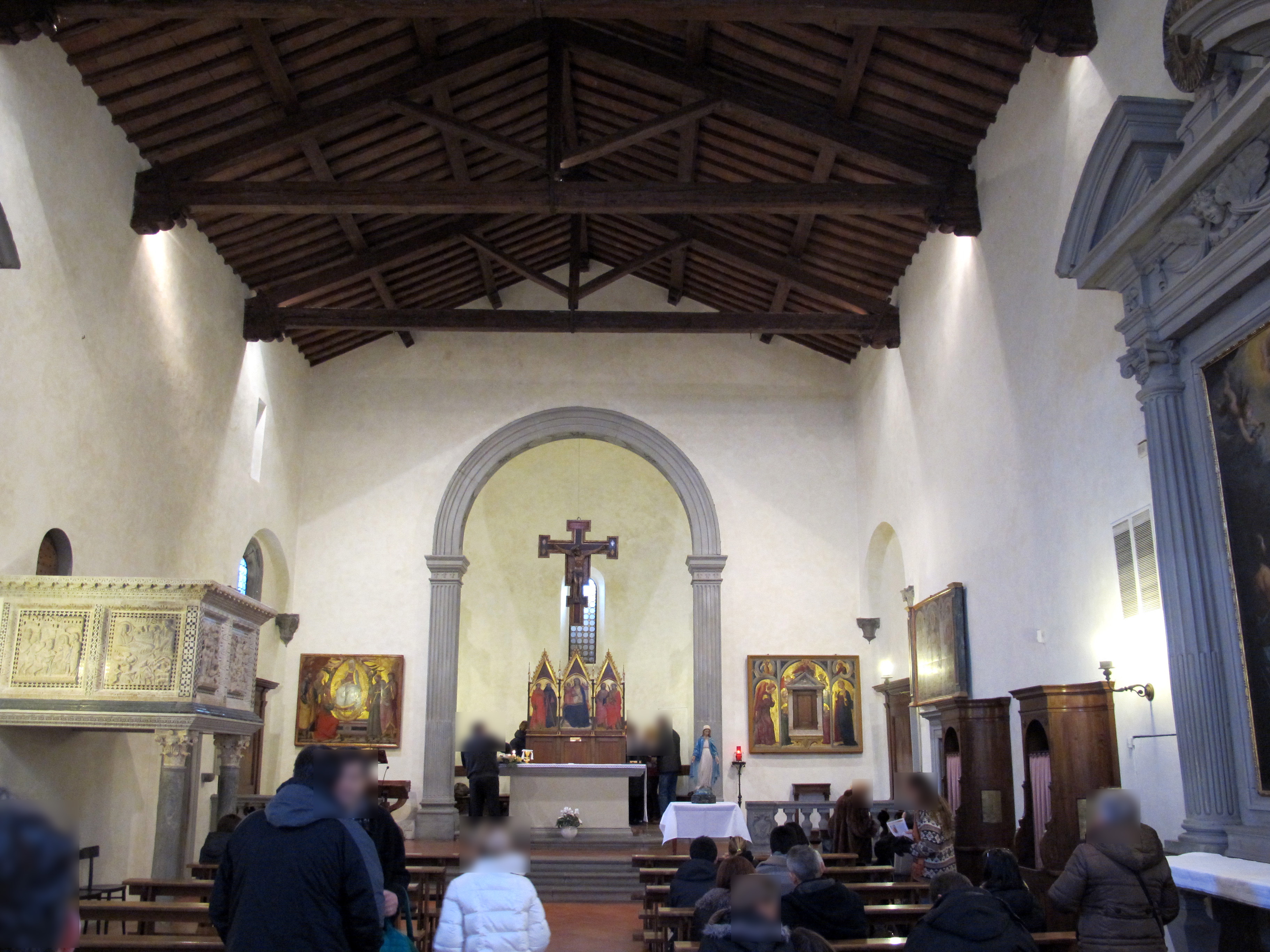
View of the main altar, pulpit on the left

A church at the site appears founded just after the year 1000, with a typical hemicircular apse. The facade is made from rustic stone bricks. In the late 19th-century, the church had much of the baroque accretions removed, reverting the interior to reveal the sparse Romanesque elements. The facade has a round oculus in the tympanum. The interior houses a 13th-century pulpit, formerly in the church of San Pier Scheraggio, and transferred here in 1782. That church was demolished during the construction of the Uffizi. The square elevated pulpit has delicately carved bas-relief square marble panels, depicting various biblical scenes:

- Adoration of the Magi
- Madonna and child
- Evangelists and the Dream of the Virgin
- Baptism of Christ
- Presentation of Christ at the Temple
- Nativity of Christ
- Deposition from the Cross

The main altarpiece presently is a 15th-century triptych by Lorenzo di Niccolò, depicting an Enthroned Madonna and Child flanked by depictions of Saints Anthony Abbot, Leonard, James the Apostle, and Lawrence. Another altarpiece depicts Archangel Raphael with Tobias, St Leonard, and St Sebastian (circa 1478) by followers of Neri di Bicci. Two altarpieces are attributed to Neri di Bicci: including a Madonna of the Assumption grants a belt to St Thomas, flanked by Saints Peter, Jerome, Francis, and John the Baptist. Cosimo Ulivelli painted some frescoes in the apse.

Dante and Boccaccio are said to have preached from the pulpit. The church stands among olive groves on the Via San Leonardo, a country road on the southern outskirts of Florence, next to Villa Spelman, seat of the Johns Hopkins University Charles S. Singleton Center for Italian Studies.
