= Porta San Giorgio, Florence =

Medieval gateway in Florence

Coordinates: 43°45′47″N 11°15′18″E

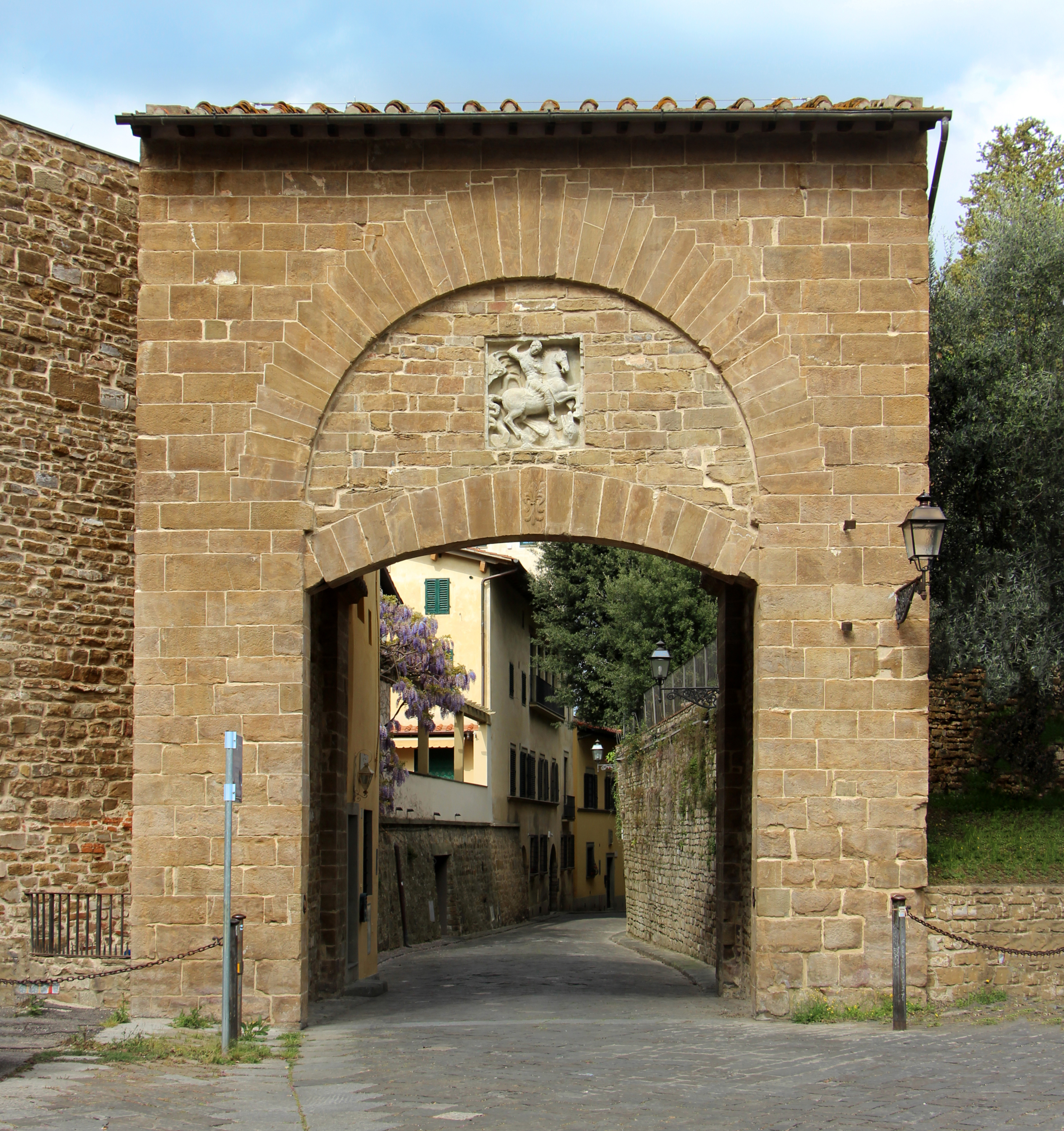
Outer entrance

The Porta San Giorgio is a medieval gateway located on the south-east end of the Oltrarno walls of Florence, Italy. Ramparts of the Belvedere fortress, begun in 1590, stand adjacent to the gate. The road away from Florence soon passes the church of San Leonardo in Arcetri.

== History and decoration ==
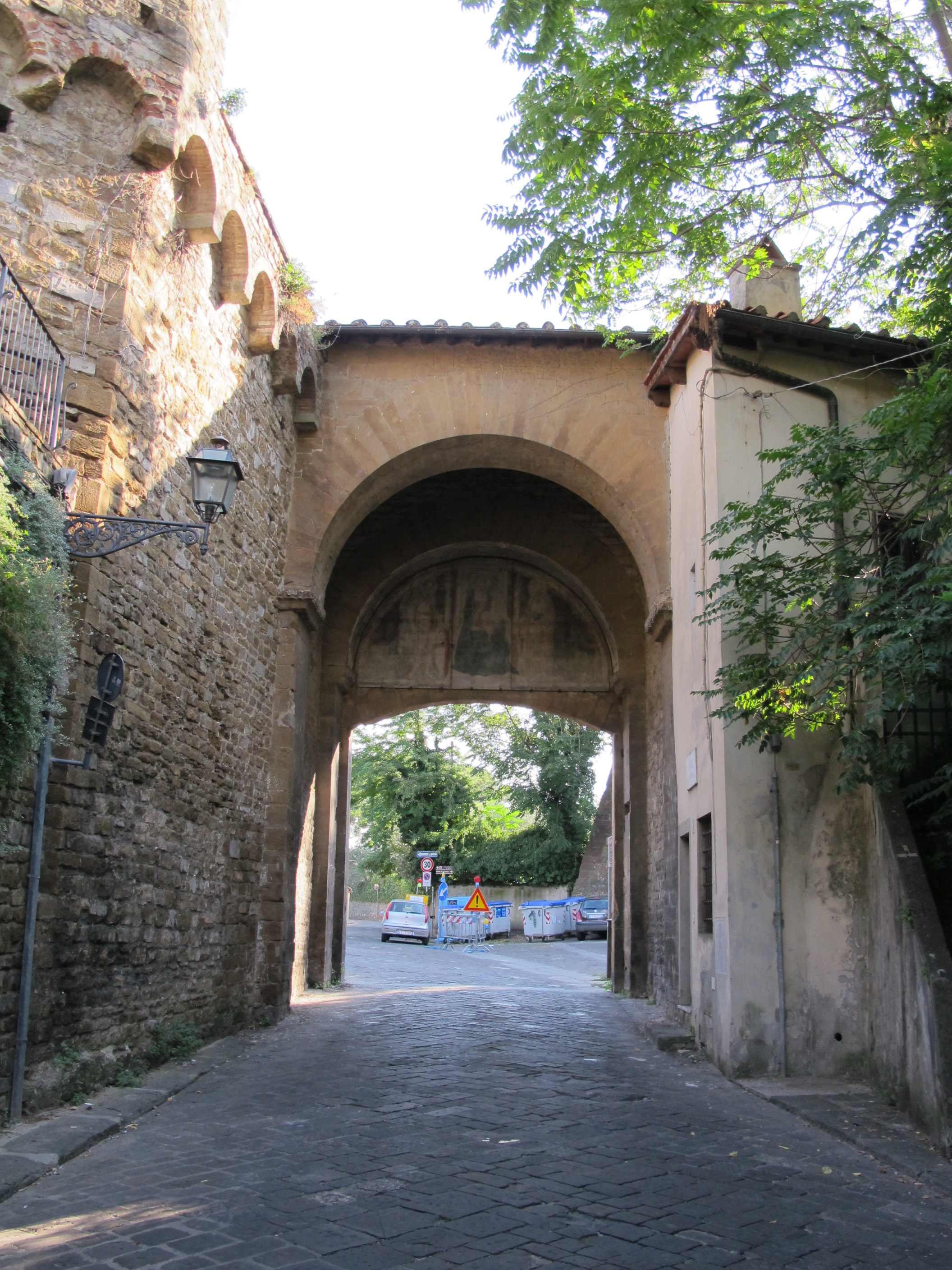
Inner entrance

The gateway was erected in 1324 in the sixth and last set of walls for the city of Florence. It was named after the nearby, but no longer extant, Church of San Giorgio. Giorgio Vasari attributed the architecture to Bernardo Daddi, although more recently it has been attributed to Andrea Orcagna. In 1529, during the siege of Florence, the gateway was sealed by Michelangelo, to defend it against cannonades. In a reconstruction during 1937, the inner portal was widened.

The interior lunette of the archway has a 14th-century fresco by Bicci di Lorenzo, Madonna and Child Between Saints, with St George on the right in armor, his shield bearing a red cross on a white field, once the heraldic symbol of Florence. On the outer face is a marble plaque with a bas-relief, St George Slaying the Dragon, by Andrea da Pontedera.
