= Federico Taddia =

Italian broadcaster

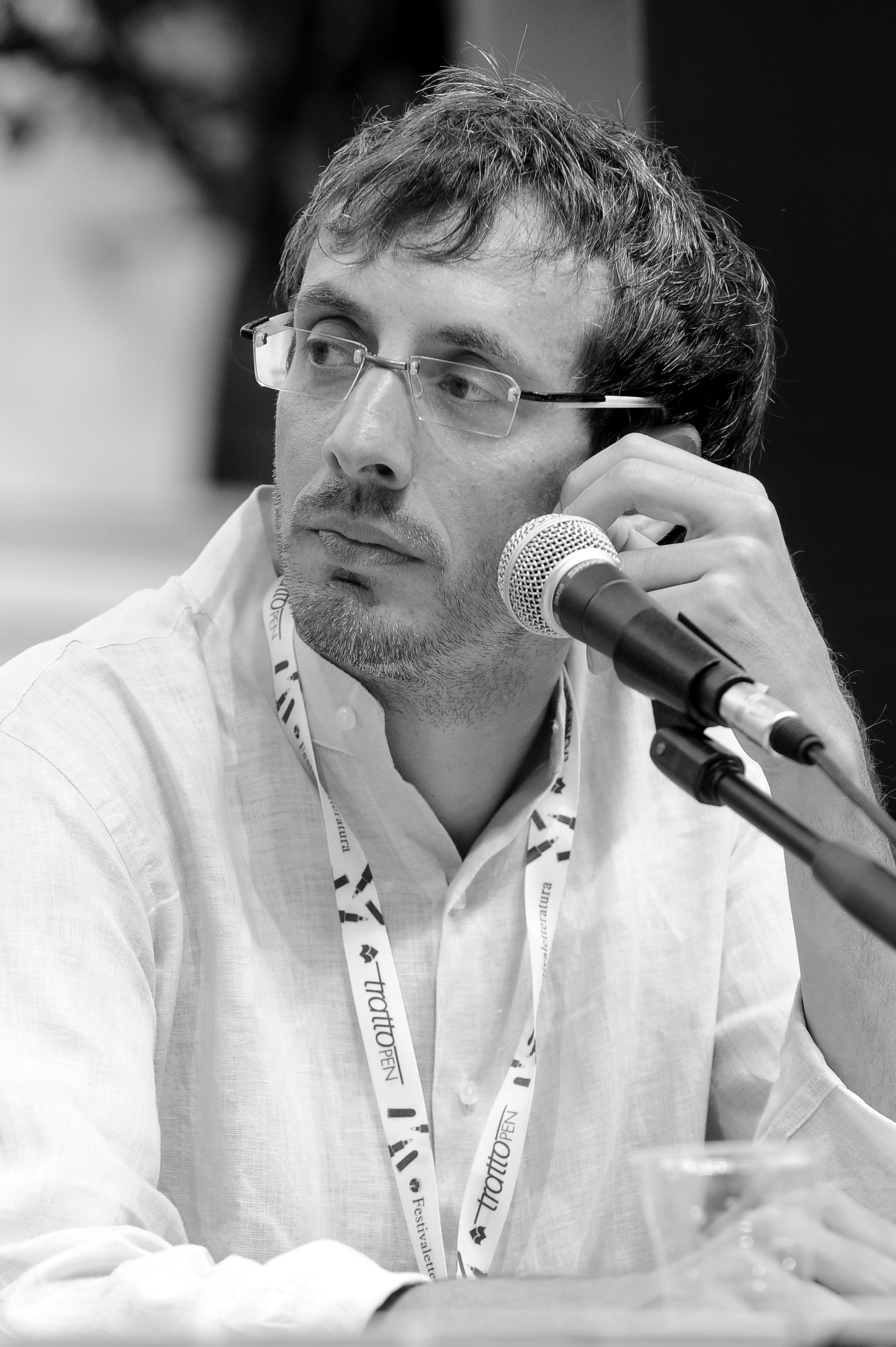
- Born: 7 February 1972 (age 53); Pieve di Cento, Italy
- Website: http://www.federicotaddia.com

Federico Taddia (born 7 February 1972 in Pieve di Cento) is an Italian radio host, television presenter, journalist and author.
