= List of minor planets: 104001–105000 =

The following is a partial list of minor planets, running from minor-planet number 104001 through 105000, inclusive. The primary data for this and other partial lists is based on JPL's "Small-Body Orbital Elements" and data available from the Minor Planet Center. Critical list information is also provided by the MPC, unless otherwise specified from Lowell Observatory. A detailed description of the table's columns and additional sources are given on the main page including a complete list of every page in this series, and a statistical break-up on the dynamical classification of minor planets.

Also see the summary list of all named bodies in numerical and alphabetical order, and the corresponding naming citations for the number range of this particular list. New namings may only be added to this list after official publication, as the preannouncement of names is condemned by the Working Group for Small Bodies Nomenclature of the International Astronomical Union.

Near-Earth obj.	MBA (inner)	MBA (outer)	Centaur
Mars-crosser	MBA (middle)	Jupiter trojan	Trans-Neptunian obj.
Unclassified

== 104001–104100 ==
Designation			Discovery			Properties		Ref
Permanent	Provisional	Named after	Date	Site	Discoverer(s)	Category	Diam.	Ref
104001	2000 DO_{99}	—	February 29, 2000	Socorro	LINEAR	·	2.0 km	MPC · JPL
104002	2000 DX_{99}	—	February 29, 2000	Socorro	LINEAR	·	1.8 km	MPC · JPL
104003	2000 DD_{100}	—	February 29, 2000	Socorro	LINEAR	·	2.1 km	MPC · JPL
104004	2000 DU_{100}	—	February 29, 2000	Socorro	LINEAR	EUN	2.5 km	MPC · JPL
104005	2000 DS_{101}	—	February 29, 2000	Socorro	LINEAR	EOS	3.2 km	MPC · JPL
104006	2000 DG_{102}	—	February 29, 2000	Socorro	LINEAR	·	2.7 km	MPC · JPL
104007	2000 DT_{102}	—	February 29, 2000	Socorro	LINEAR	WIT	2.0 km	MPC · JPL
104008	2000 DY_{102}	—	February 29, 2000	Socorro	LINEAR	·	1.4 km	MPC · JPL
104009	2000 DD_{103}	—	February 29, 2000	Socorro	LINEAR	·	1.9 km	MPC · JPL
104010	2000 DH_{105}	—	February 29, 2000	Socorro	LINEAR	·	2.7 km	MPC · JPL
104011	2000 DQ_{105}	—	February 29, 2000	Socorro	LINEAR	·	3.3 km	MPC · JPL
104012	2000 DV_{106}	—	February 29, 2000	Socorro	LINEAR	·	4.0 km	MPC · JPL
104013	2000 DL_{107}	—	February 29, 2000	Socorro	LINEAR	·	3.4 km	MPC · JPL
104014	2000 DR_{107}	—	February 28, 2000	Socorro	LINEAR	·	4.0 km	MPC · JPL
104015	2000 DF_{108}	—	February 28, 2000	Socorro	LINEAR	EOS	3.7 km	MPC · JPL
104016	2000 DH_{108}	—	February 29, 2000	Socorro	LINEAR	·	2.8 km	MPC · JPL
104017	2000 DO_{108}	—	February 29, 2000	Socorro	LINEAR	·	3.2 km	MPC · JPL
104018	2000 DF_{109}	—	February 29, 2000	Socorro	LINEAR	MAS	990 m	MPC · JPL
104019	2000 DT_{109}	—	February 29, 2000	Socorro	LINEAR	·	2.5 km	MPC · JPL
104020 Heilbronn	2000 DL_{110}	Heilbronn	February 26, 2000	Uccle	T. Pauwels	·	4.2 km	MPC · JPL
104021	2000 DW_{110}	—	February 25, 2000	Socorro	LINEAR	·	4.2 km	MPC · JPL
104022	2000 DJ_{111}	—	February 29, 2000	Socorro	LINEAR	·	2.0 km	MPC · JPL
104023	2000 DZ_{111}	—	February 29, 2000	Socorro	LINEAR	·	5.1 km	MPC · JPL
104024	2000 DA_{112}	—	February 29, 2000	Socorro	LINEAR	·	5.6 km	MPC · JPL
104025	2000 DF_{112}	—	February 29, 2000	Socorro	LINEAR	·	2.1 km	MPC · JPL
104026	2000 DY_{112}	—	February 25, 2000	Kitt Peak	Spacewatch	·	4.1 km	MPC · JPL
104027	2000 DA_{113}	—	February 25, 2000	Kitt Peak	Spacewatch	NYS	1.8 km	MPC · JPL
104028	2000 DT_{113}	—	February 27, 2000	Kitt Peak	Spacewatch	·	5.4 km	MPC · JPL
104029	2000 DG_{115}	—	February 27, 2000	Kitt Peak	Spacewatch	AGN	2.8 km	MPC · JPL
104030	2000 DK_{116}	—	February 25, 2000	Catalina	CSS	·	3.0 km	MPC · JPL
104031	2000 EA	—	March 1, 2000	Oaxaca	Roe, J. M.	·	6.2 km	MPC · JPL
104032	2000 ED_{1}	—	March 3, 2000	Socorro	LINEAR	NYS ·	2.9 km	MPC · JPL
104033	2000 EJ_{1}	—	March 3, 2000	Socorro	LINEAR	·	3.2 km	MPC · JPL
104034	2000 EK_{1}	—	March 3, 2000	Socorro	LINEAR	HYG	6.2 km	MPC · JPL
104035	2000 ER_{1}	—	March 3, 2000	Socorro	LINEAR	KOR	2.7 km	MPC · JPL
104036	2000 EJ_{4}	—	March 2, 2000	Kitt Peak	Spacewatch	·	3.4 km	MPC · JPL
104037	2000 EK_{4}	—	March 2, 2000	Kitt Peak	Spacewatch	·	2.6 km	MPC · JPL
104038	2000 EP_{4}	—	March 2, 2000	Kitt Peak	Spacewatch	·	1.4 km	MPC · JPL
104039	2000 EY_{5}	—	March 2, 2000	Kitt Peak	Spacewatch	·	4.6 km	MPC · JPL
104040	2000 EK_{6}	—	March 2, 2000	Kitt Peak	Spacewatch	TEL	2.4 km	MPC · JPL
104041	2000 EE_{8}	—	March 3, 2000	Socorro	LINEAR	·	3.3 km	MPC · JPL
104042	2000 EJ_{10}	—	March 3, 2000	Socorro	LINEAR	·	1.9 km	MPC · JPL
104043	2000 EU_{10}	—	March 4, 2000	Socorro	LINEAR	·	2.4 km	MPC · JPL
104044	2000 EA_{11}	—	March 4, 2000	Socorro	LINEAR	·	2.7 km	MPC · JPL
104045	2000 EC_{11}	—	March 4, 2000	Socorro	LINEAR	·	4.3 km	MPC · JPL
104046	2000 EW_{11}	—	March 4, 2000	Socorro	LINEAR	URS	6.6 km	MPC · JPL
104047	2000 EM_{12}	—	March 4, 2000	Socorro	LINEAR	·	2.9 km	MPC · JPL
104048	2000 EL_{13}	—	March 5, 2000	Socorro	LINEAR	·	3.0 km	MPC · JPL
104049	2000 EP_{13}	—	March 5, 2000	Socorro	LINEAR	·	5.5 km	MPC · JPL
104050	2000 ET_{13}	—	March 5, 2000	Socorro	LINEAR	·	1.7 km	MPC · JPL
104051	2000 ET_{14}	—	March 3, 2000	Socorro	LINEAR	·	2.9 km	MPC · JPL
104052 Zachery	2000 EE_{15}	Zachery	March 6, 2000	Lake Tekapo	Brady, N.	·	2.7 km	MPC · JPL
104053	2000 EE_{16}	—	March 3, 2000	Kitt Peak	Spacewatch	·	4.4 km	MPC · JPL
104054	2000 ET_{16}	—	March 3, 2000	Socorro	LINEAR	(5)	3.5 km	MPC · JPL
104055	2000 EQ_{17}	—	March 4, 2000	Socorro	LINEAR	·	2.9 km	MPC · JPL
104056	2000 ES_{17}	—	March 4, 2000	Socorro	LINEAR	(2076)	1.5 km	MPC · JPL
104057	2000 EU_{17}	—	March 4, 2000	Socorro	LINEAR	EUN	2.8 km	MPC · JPL
104058	2000 EV_{17}	—	March 4, 2000	Socorro	LINEAR	V	1.4 km	MPC · JPL
104059	2000 EZ_{17}	—	March 4, 2000	Socorro	LINEAR	EUN	2.2 km	MPC · JPL
104060	2000 EM_{18}	—	March 5, 2000	Socorro	LINEAR	·	4.2 km	MPC · JPL
104061	2000 EP_{18}	—	March 5, 2000	Socorro	LINEAR	·	5.0 km	MPC · JPL
104062	2000 EU_{18}	—	March 5, 2000	Socorro	LINEAR	·	5.1 km	MPC · JPL
104063	2000 EX_{18}	—	March 5, 2000	Socorro	LINEAR	·	1.6 km	MPC · JPL
104064	2000 EF_{19}	—	March 5, 2000	Socorro	LINEAR	V	1.1 km	MPC · JPL
104065	2000 EJ_{19}	—	March 5, 2000	Socorro	LINEAR	·	4.8 km	MPC · JPL
104066	2000 EN_{20}	—	March 3, 2000	Catalina	CSS	·	4.8 km	MPC · JPL
104067	2000 EY_{20}	—	March 3, 2000	Catalina	CSS	·	7.5 km	MPC · JPL
104068	2000 EJ_{22}	—	March 3, 2000	Kitt Peak	Spacewatch	KOR	2.7 km	MPC · JPL
104069	2000 EU_{22}	—	March 3, 2000	Kitt Peak	Spacewatch	·	1.5 km	MPC · JPL
104070	2000 EM_{23}	—	March 8, 2000	Kitt Peak	Spacewatch	·	3.0 km	MPC · JPL
104071	2000 ET_{23}	—	March 8, 2000	Kitt Peak	Spacewatch	·	3.2 km	MPC · JPL
104072	2000 EU_{23}	—	March 8, 2000	Kitt Peak	Spacewatch	KOR	2.4 km	MPC · JPL
104073	2000 EZ_{24}	—	March 8, 2000	Kitt Peak	Spacewatch	·	3.5 km	MPC · JPL
104074	2000 ES_{25}	—	March 8, 2000	Kitt Peak	Spacewatch	·	2.4 km	MPC · JPL
104075	2000 EE_{27}	—	March 3, 2000	Socorro	LINEAR	·	2.0 km	MPC · JPL
104076	2000 EB_{28}	—	March 4, 2000	Socorro	LINEAR	·	2.7 km	MPC · JPL
104077	2000 EF_{28}	—	March 4, 2000	Socorro	LINEAR	·	2.9 km	MPC · JPL
104078	2000 EK_{29}	—	March 5, 2000	Socorro	LINEAR	·	6.2 km	MPC · JPL
104079	2000 EC_{30}	—	March 5, 2000	Socorro	LINEAR	·	4.5 km	MPC · JPL
104080	2000 EE_{30}	—	March 5, 2000	Socorro	LINEAR	·	1.9 km	MPC · JPL
104081	2000 EH_{30}	—	March 5, 2000	Socorro	LINEAR	V	1.1 km	MPC · JPL
104082	2000 EQ_{30}	—	March 5, 2000	Socorro	LINEAR	·	2.7 km	MPC · JPL
104083	2000 EU_{30}	—	March 5, 2000	Socorro	LINEAR	EOS	5.2 km	MPC · JPL
104084	2000 EA_{32}	—	March 5, 2000	Socorro	LINEAR	·	1.8 km	MPC · JPL
104085	2000 EF_{32}	—	March 5, 2000	Socorro	LINEAR	·	4.7 km	MPC · JPL
104086	2000 EM_{32}	—	March 5, 2000	Socorro	LINEAR	EOS	3.8 km	MPC · JPL
104087	2000 EV_{32}	—	March 5, 2000	Socorro	LINEAR	fast	2.7 km	MPC · JPL
104088	2000 EZ_{32}	—	March 5, 2000	Socorro	LINEAR	·	3.0 km	MPC · JPL
104089	2000 EJ_{33}	—	March 5, 2000	Socorro	LINEAR	·	1.8 km	MPC · JPL
104090	2000 ET_{33}	—	March 5, 2000	Socorro	LINEAR	·	3.6 km	MPC · JPL
104091	2000 EA_{34}	—	March 5, 2000	Socorro	LINEAR	·	3.8 km	MPC · JPL
104092	2000 EN_{34}	—	March 5, 2000	Socorro	LINEAR	·	4.5 km	MPC · JPL
104093	2000 EO_{34}	—	March 5, 2000	Socorro	LINEAR	·	2.3 km	MPC · JPL
104094	2000 EX_{34}	—	March 6, 2000	Socorro	LINEAR	·	3.3 km	MPC · JPL
104095	2000 EB_{35}	—	March 6, 2000	Socorro	LINEAR	·	3.3 km	MPC · JPL
104096	2000 EN_{35}	—	March 8, 2000	Socorro	LINEAR	·	2.5 km	MPC · JPL
104097	2000 EH_{36}	—	March 5, 2000	Socorro	LINEAR	·	5.1 km	MPC · JPL
104098	2000 EQ_{37}	—	March 8, 2000	Socorro	LINEAR	KOR	3.6 km	MPC · JPL
104099	2000 EW_{37}	—	March 8, 2000	Socorro	LINEAR	V	1.9 km	MPC · JPL
104100	2000 ER_{39}	—	March 8, 2000	Socorro	LINEAR	·	1.8 km	MPC · JPL

== 104101–104200 ==
back to top

Designation			Discovery			Properties		Ref
Permanent	Provisional	Named after	Date	Site	Discoverer(s)	Category	Diam.	Ref
104101	2000 EK_{42}	—	March 8, 2000	Socorro	LINEAR	·	6.7 km	MPC · JPL
104102	2000 EB_{43}	—	March 8, 2000	Socorro	LINEAR	3:2	9.9 km	MPC · JPL
104103	2000 EW_{43}	—	March 8, 2000	Socorro	LINEAR	·	4.5 km	MPC · JPL
104104	2000 EB_{44}	—	March 8, 2000	Socorro	LINEAR	·	2.2 km	MPC · JPL
104105	2000 EQ_{44}	—	March 9, 2000	Socorro	LINEAR	·	3.2 km	MPC · JPL
104106	2000 ES_{44}	—	March 9, 2000	Socorro	LINEAR	·	2.3 km	MPC · JPL
104107	2000 EB_{45}	—	March 9, 2000	Socorro	LINEAR	·	2.6 km	MPC · JPL
104108	2000 EH_{45}	—	March 9, 2000	Socorro	LINEAR	KOR	3.1 km	MPC · JPL
104109	2000 EN_{46}	—	March 9, 2000	Socorro	LINEAR	V	1.4 km	MPC · JPL
104110	2000 EA_{47}	—	March 9, 2000	Socorro	LINEAR	·	2.1 km	MPC · JPL
104111	2000 EE_{47}	—	March 9, 2000	Socorro	LINEAR	·	3.5 km	MPC · JPL
104112	2000 EO_{47}	—	March 9, 2000	Socorro	LINEAR	·	1.4 km	MPC · JPL
104113	2000 EJ_{49}	—	March 9, 2000	Socorro	LINEAR	·	3.1 km	MPC · JPL
104114	2000 EO_{50}	—	March 10, 2000	Prescott	P. G. Comba	NYS	2.1 km	MPC · JPL
104115	2000 EX_{51}	—	March 3, 2000	Kitt Peak	Spacewatch	KOR	2.0 km	MPC · JPL
104116	2000 EF_{52}	—	March 3, 2000	Kitt Peak	Spacewatch	KOR	3.3 km	MPC · JPL
104117	2000 EZ_{52}	—	March 3, 2000	Kitt Peak	Spacewatch	·	2.0 km	MPC · JPL
104118	2000 EU_{53}	—	March 9, 2000	Kitt Peak	Spacewatch	·	1.9 km	MPC · JPL
104119	2000 EF_{54}	—	March 9, 2000	Kitt Peak	Spacewatch	·	5.4 km	MPC · JPL
104120	2000 EL_{55}	—	March 10, 2000	Kitt Peak	Spacewatch	·	6.1 km	MPC · JPL
104121	2000 ET_{55}	—	March 5, 2000	Socorro	LINEAR	·	1.9 km	MPC · JPL
104122	2000 EG_{56}	—	March 8, 2000	Socorro	LINEAR	·	2.3 km	MPC · JPL
104123	2000 EY_{56}	—	March 8, 2000	Socorro	LINEAR	·	1.5 km	MPC · JPL
104124	2000 EU_{57}	—	March 8, 2000	Socorro	LINEAR	·	1.7 km	MPC · JPL
104125	2000 EC_{58}	—	March 8, 2000	Socorro	LINEAR	H	1.5 km	MPC · JPL
104126	2000 ET_{58}	—	March 8, 2000	Socorro	LINEAR	TEL	2.5 km	MPC · JPL
104127	2000 EG_{59}	—	March 9, 2000	Socorro	LINEAR	·	5.4 km	MPC · JPL
104128	2000 EK_{59}	—	March 9, 2000	Socorro	LINEAR	·	3.5 km	MPC · JPL
104129	2000 EB_{60}	—	March 10, 2000	Socorro	LINEAR	·	2.6 km	MPC · JPL
104130	2000 EZ_{60}	—	March 10, 2000	Socorro	LINEAR	EOS	3.6 km	MPC · JPL
104131	2000 EE_{61}	—	March 10, 2000	Socorro	LINEAR	·	2.6 km	MPC · JPL
104132	2000 EO_{61}	—	March 10, 2000	Socorro	LINEAR	·	8.1 km	MPC · JPL
104133	2000 EX_{62}	—	March 10, 2000	Socorro	LINEAR	·	2.1 km	MPC · JPL
104134	2000 EB_{63}	—	March 10, 2000	Socorro	LINEAR	KOR	3.0 km	MPC · JPL
104135	2000 EG_{63}	—	March 10, 2000	Socorro	LINEAR	·	3.2 km	MPC · JPL
104136	2000 EH_{63}	—	March 10, 2000	Socorro	LINEAR	NYS ·	2.6 km	MPC · JPL
104137	2000 EE_{64}	—	March 10, 2000	Socorro	LINEAR	·	1.3 km	MPC · JPL
104138	2000 EQ_{64}	—	March 10, 2000	Socorro	LINEAR	·	4.3 km	MPC · JPL
104139	2000 EA_{65}	—	March 10, 2000	Socorro	LINEAR	·	4.0 km	MPC · JPL
104140	2000 EB_{65}	—	March 10, 2000	Socorro	LINEAR	·	4.2 km	MPC · JPL
104141	2000 EE_{65}	—	March 10, 2000	Socorro	LINEAR	·	3.8 km	MPC · JPL
104142	2000 EN_{65}	—	March 10, 2000	Socorro	LINEAR	NAE	5.6 km	MPC · JPL
104143	2000 EU_{65}	—	March 10, 2000	Socorro	LINEAR	·	4.9 km	MPC · JPL
104144	2000 EP_{66}	—	March 10, 2000	Socorro	LINEAR	·	6.7 km	MPC · JPL
104145	2000 EW_{66}	—	March 10, 2000	Socorro	LINEAR	THM	5.6 km	MPC · JPL
104146	2000 EE_{67}	—	March 10, 2000	Socorro	LINEAR	·	3.8 km	MPC · JPL
104147	2000 EH_{67}	—	March 10, 2000	Socorro	LINEAR	·	4.9 km	MPC · JPL
104148	2000 EJ_{67}	—	March 10, 2000	Socorro	LINEAR	·	2.8 km	MPC · JPL
104149	2000 ET_{67}	—	March 10, 2000	Socorro	LINEAR	·	2.7 km	MPC · JPL
104150	2000 EE_{68}	—	March 10, 2000	Socorro	LINEAR	·	3.1 km	MPC · JPL
104151	2000 EK_{68}	—	March 10, 2000	Socorro	LINEAR	KOR	2.8 km	MPC · JPL
104152	2000 EU_{68}	—	March 10, 2000	Socorro	LINEAR	THM	4.1 km	MPC · JPL
104153	2000 EC_{69}	—	March 10, 2000	Socorro	LINEAR	·	4.2 km	MPC · JPL
104154	2000 EP_{69}	—	March 10, 2000	Socorro	LINEAR	·	9.6 km	MPC · JPL
104155	2000 ER_{69}	—	March 10, 2000	Socorro	LINEAR	RAF	1.7 km	MPC · JPL
104156	2000 ET_{69}	—	March 10, 2000	Socorro	LINEAR	·	1.9 km	MPC · JPL
104157	2000 EW_{69}	—	March 10, 2000	Socorro	LINEAR	·	3.3 km	MPC · JPL
104158	2000 EF_{70}	—	March 10, 2000	Socorro	LINEAR	·	6.9 km	MPC · JPL
104159	2000 ED_{73}	—	March 10, 2000	Kitt Peak	Spacewatch	MAS	1.4 km	MPC · JPL
104160	2000 EF_{74}	—	March 10, 2000	Kitt Peak	Spacewatch	TEL	4.1 km	MPC · JPL
104161	2000 EQ_{75}	—	March 5, 2000	Socorro	LINEAR	·	4.6 km	MPC · JPL
104162	2000 EB_{76}	—	March 5, 2000	Socorro	LINEAR	·	1.5 km	MPC · JPL
104163	2000 EL_{76}	—	March 5, 2000	Socorro	LINEAR	PHO	1.7 km	MPC · JPL
104164	2000 EP_{77}	—	March 5, 2000	Socorro	LINEAR	·	4.4 km	MPC · JPL
104165	2000 EY_{77}	—	March 5, 2000	Socorro	LINEAR	·	2.6 km	MPC · JPL
104166	2000 EL_{78}	—	March 5, 2000	Socorro	LINEAR	·	5.4 km	MPC · JPL
104167	2000 EL_{79}	—	March 5, 2000	Socorro	LINEAR	·	5.4 km	MPC · JPL
104168	2000 EU_{79}	—	March 5, 2000	Socorro	LINEAR	·	2.8 km	MPC · JPL
104169	2000 EB_{80}	—	March 5, 2000	Socorro	LINEAR	HYG	8.0 km	MPC · JPL
104170	2000 EB_{81}	—	March 5, 2000	Socorro	LINEAR	·	1.9 km	MPC · JPL
104171	2000 EK_{81}	—	March 5, 2000	Socorro	LINEAR	·	1.7 km	MPC · JPL
104172	2000 EE_{82}	—	March 5, 2000	Socorro	LINEAR	·	4.1 km	MPC · JPL
104173	2000 EE_{83}	—	March 5, 2000	Socorro	LINEAR	·	4.7 km	MPC · JPL
104174	2000 EY_{83}	—	March 5, 2000	Socorro	LINEAR	·	4.4 km	MPC · JPL
104175	2000 EJ_{84}	—	March 6, 2000	Socorro	LINEAR	·	4.1 km	MPC · JPL
104176	2000 EX_{85}	—	March 8, 2000	Socorro	LINEAR	·	2.7 km	MPC · JPL
104177	2000 EO_{87}	—	March 8, 2000	Socorro	LINEAR	NYS	2.4 km	MPC · JPL
104178	2000 EC_{90}	—	March 9, 2000	Socorro	LINEAR	V	1.6 km	MPC · JPL
104179	2000 EZ_{90}	—	March 9, 2000	Socorro	LINEAR	·	3.4 km	MPC · JPL
104180	2000 EM_{91}	—	March 9, 2000	Socorro	LINEAR	·	5.1 km	MPC · JPL
104181	2000 EA_{96}	—	March 11, 2000	Socorro	LINEAR	·	3.0 km	MPC · JPL
104182	2000 EB_{96}	—	March 11, 2000	Socorro	LINEAR	V · slow	1.4 km	MPC · JPL
104183	2000 EH_{96}	—	March 11, 2000	Socorro	LINEAR	MAS	1.3 km	MPC · JPL
104184	2000 EK_{96}	—	March 11, 2000	Socorro	LINEAR	EUP	7.2 km	MPC · JPL
104185	2000 EG_{98}	—	March 9, 2000	Kitt Peak	Spacewatch	·	2.1 km	MPC · JPL
104186	2000 EH_{98}	—	March 9, 2000	Kitt Peak	Spacewatch	·	2.9 km	MPC · JPL
104187	2000 EJ_{98}	—	March 9, 2000	Kitt Peak	Spacewatch	·	2.3 km	MPC · JPL
104188	2000 EW_{99}	—	March 12, 2000	Kitt Peak	Spacewatch	KOR	2.9 km	MPC · JPL
104189	2000 EQ_{100}	—	March 12, 2000	Kitt Peak	Spacewatch	NYS	1.3 km	MPC · JPL
104190	2000 EL_{101}	—	March 12, 2000	Kitt Peak	Spacewatch	KOR	1.9 km	MPC · JPL
104191	2000 EN_{101}	—	March 12, 2000	Kitt Peak	Spacewatch	·	3.4 km	MPC · JPL
104192	2000 EE_{102}	—	March 14, 2000	Kitt Peak	Spacewatch	(12739)	2.9 km	MPC · JPL
104193	2000 EO_{102}	—	March 14, 2000	Kitt Peak	Spacewatch	·	3.1 km	MPC · JPL
104194	2000 EE_{103}	—	March 11, 2000	Socorro	LINEAR	EUN	3.6 km	MPC · JPL
104195	2000 EN_{103}	—	March 12, 2000	Socorro	LINEAR	HNS	3.1 km	MPC · JPL
104196	2000 EL_{105}	—	March 11, 2000	Anderson Mesa	LONEOS	·	3.0 km	MPC · JPL
104197	2000 ET_{105}	—	March 11, 2000	Anderson Mesa	LONEOS	·	5.3 km	MPC · JPL
104198	2000 ED_{106}	—	March 11, 2000	Anderson Mesa	LONEOS	·	7.6 km	MPC · JPL
104199	2000 EO_{107}	—	March 8, 2000	Socorro	LINEAR	·	2.8 km	MPC · JPL
104200	2000 EL_{108}	—	March 8, 2000	Socorro	LINEAR	·	4.3 km	MPC · JPL

== 104201–104300 ==
back to top

Designation			Discovery			Properties		Ref
Permanent	Provisional	Named after	Date	Site	Discoverer(s)	Category	Diam.	Ref
104201	2000 EN_{108}	—	March 8, 2000	Haleakala	NEAT	·	4.5 km	MPC · JPL
104202	2000 ES_{108}	—	March 8, 2000	Socorro	LINEAR	·	2.9 km	MPC · JPL
104203	2000 EY_{109}	—	March 8, 2000	Haleakala	NEAT	·	3.4 km	MPC · JPL
104204	2000 EA_{111}	—	March 8, 2000	Haleakala	NEAT	TIR	4.2 km	MPC · JPL
104205	2000 EE_{112}	—	March 9, 2000	Socorro	LINEAR	·	3.2 km	MPC · JPL
104206	2000 EO_{112}	—	March 9, 2000	Socorro	LINEAR	KOR	2.6 km	MPC · JPL
104207	2000 ED_{113}	—	March 9, 2000	Socorro	LINEAR	·	4.7 km	MPC · JPL
104208	2000 EQ_{113}	—	March 9, 2000	Kitt Peak	Spacewatch	·	4.5 km	MPC · JPL
104209	2000 EN_{115}	—	March 10, 2000	Kitt Peak	Spacewatch	·	3.9 km	MPC · JPL
104210 Leeupton	2000 ES_{116}	Leeupton	March 10, 2000	Socorro	LINEAR	·	2.6 km	MPC · JPL
104211	2000 EW_{116}	—	March 10, 2000	Socorro	LINEAR	·	1.9 km	MPC · JPL
104212	2000 ER_{117}	—	March 11, 2000	Anderson Mesa	LONEOS	·	7.5 km	MPC · JPL
104213	2000 EE_{118}	—	March 11, 2000	Anderson Mesa	LONEOS	GEF	2.7 km	MPC · JPL
104214	2000 EJ_{118}	—	March 11, 2000	Anderson Mesa	LONEOS	·	5.3 km	MPC · JPL
104215	2000 ES_{118}	—	March 11, 2000	Anderson Mesa	LONEOS	·	3.2 km	MPC · JPL
104216	2000 EF_{119}	—	March 11, 2000	Anderson Mesa	LONEOS	·	4.4 km	MPC · JPL
104217	2000 EM_{119}	—	March 11, 2000	Anderson Mesa	LONEOS	·	4.5 km	MPC · JPL
104218	2000 EU_{119}	—	March 11, 2000	Anderson Mesa	LONEOS	(32418)	4.1 km	MPC · JPL
104219	2000 EO_{120}	—	March 11, 2000	Anderson Mesa	LONEOS	·	4.2 km	MPC · JPL
104220	2000 EP_{120}	—	March 11, 2000	Anderson Mesa	LONEOS	V	1.4 km	MPC · JPL
104221	2000 EU_{120}	—	March 11, 2000	Anderson Mesa	LONEOS	·	8.0 km	MPC · JPL
104222	2000 EH_{121}	—	March 11, 2000	Anderson Mesa	LONEOS	·	7.2 km	MPC · JPL
104223	2000 EP_{121}	—	March 11, 2000	Anderson Mesa	LONEOS	JUN	2.9 km	MPC · JPL
104224	2000 EC_{122}	—	March 11, 2000	Anderson Mesa	LONEOS	·	5.6 km	MPC · JPL
104225	2000 EE_{123}	—	March 11, 2000	Socorro	LINEAR	·	1.9 km	MPC · JPL
104226	2000 EN_{123}	—	March 11, 2000	Anderson Mesa	LONEOS	KOR	3.4 km	MPC · JPL
104227	2000 EH_{125}	—	March 11, 2000	Anderson Mesa	LONEOS	·	5.7 km	MPC · JPL
104228	2000 EG_{127}	—	March 11, 2000	Anderson Mesa	LONEOS	NEM	5.4 km	MPC · JPL
104229	2000 ER_{128}	—	March 11, 2000	Anderson Mesa	LONEOS	·	3.6 km	MPC · JPL
104230	2000 EZ_{128}	—	March 11, 2000	Anderson Mesa	LONEOS	GEF	2.4 km	MPC · JPL
104231	2000 EE_{129}	—	March 11, 2000	Anderson Mesa	LONEOS	·	4.7 km	MPC · JPL
104232	2000 ET_{129}	—	March 11, 2000	Anderson Mesa	LONEOS	·	4.6 km	MPC · JPL
104233	2000 EV_{129}	—	March 11, 2000	Anderson Mesa	LONEOS	·	2.1 km	MPC · JPL
104234	2000 EL_{130}	—	March 11, 2000	Anderson Mesa	LONEOS	MAS	1.5 km	MPC · JPL
104235	2000 EL_{131}	—	March 11, 2000	Socorro	LINEAR	·	2.3 km	MPC · JPL
104236	2000 EG_{132}	—	March 11, 2000	Socorro	LINEAR	·	2.2 km	MPC · JPL
104237	2000 EU_{132}	—	March 11, 2000	Socorro	LINEAR	·	2.6 km	MPC · JPL
104238	2000 EB_{133}	—	March 11, 2000	Socorro	LINEAR	AGN	2.8 km	MPC · JPL
104239	2000 EG_{133}	—	March 11, 2000	Socorro	LINEAR	·	1.3 km	MPC · JPL
104240	2000 ET_{133}	—	March 11, 2000	Anderson Mesa	LONEOS	EOS	3.9 km	MPC · JPL
104241	2000 EB_{134}	—	March 11, 2000	Anderson Mesa	LONEOS	·	4.1 km	MPC · JPL
104242	2000 EL_{134}	—	March 11, 2000	Anderson Mesa	LONEOS	·	2.5 km	MPC · JPL
104243	2000 ES_{134}	—	March 11, 2000	Anderson Mesa	LONEOS	NYS	2.1 km	MPC · JPL
104244	2000 EX_{134}	—	March 11, 2000	Anderson Mesa	LONEOS	EOS	3.6 km	MPC · JPL
104245	2000 ED_{135}	—	March 11, 2000	Anderson Mesa	LONEOS	·	2.9 km	MPC · JPL
104246	2000 EM_{135}	—	March 11, 2000	Anderson Mesa	LONEOS	·	3.5 km	MPC · JPL
104247	2000 EH_{136}	—	March 11, 2000	Socorro	LINEAR	EOS	3.8 km	MPC · JPL
104248	2000 EJ_{136}	—	March 11, 2000	Socorro	LINEAR	·	4.0 km	MPC · JPL
104249	2000 EQ_{136}	—	March 12, 2000	Socorro	LINEAR	AGN	3.4 km	MPC · JPL
104250	2000 ET_{136}	—	March 12, 2000	Socorro	LINEAR	·	3.2 km	MPC · JPL
104251	2000 EJ_{137}	—	March 7, 2000	Socorro	LINEAR	EOS	4.6 km	MPC · JPL
104252	2000 EJ_{138}	—	March 11, 2000	Socorro	LINEAR	·	4.8 km	MPC · JPL
104253	2000 EK_{138}	—	March 11, 2000	Socorro	LINEAR	·	3.4 km	MPC · JPL
104254	2000 ET_{139}	—	March 12, 2000	Catalina	CSS	·	3.3 km	MPC · JPL
104255	2000 EJ_{140}	—	March 1, 2000	Catalina	CSS	·	5.4 km	MPC · JPL
104256	2000 EA_{141}	—	March 2, 2000	Catalina	CSS	·	1.7 km	MPC · JPL
104257	2000 EC_{141}	—	March 2, 2000	Catalina	CSS	·	2.6 km	MPC · JPL
104258	2000 EQ_{141}	—	March 2, 2000	Catalina	CSS	·	9.6 km	MPC · JPL
104259	2000 EK_{142}	—	March 3, 2000	Kitt Peak	Spacewatch	AEO	1.9 km	MPC · JPL
104260	2000 EF_{144}	—	March 3, 2000	Catalina	CSS	·	4.7 km	MPC · JPL
104261	2000 ES_{144}	—	March 3, 2000	Kitt Peak	Spacewatch	KOR	2.2 km	MPC · JPL
104262	2000 EY_{144}	—	March 3, 2000	Catalina	CSS	WIT	2.5 km	MPC · JPL
104263	2000 EZ_{144}	—	March 3, 2000	Catalina	CSS	·	8.0 km	MPC · JPL
104264	2000 EW_{145}	—	March 3, 2000	Haleakala	NEAT	·	3.4 km	MPC · JPL
104265	2000 EK_{146}	—	March 4, 2000	Catalina	CSS	EUN	2.2 km	MPC · JPL
104266	2000 EW_{146}	—	March 4, 2000	Socorro	LINEAR	·	4.2 km	MPC · JPL
104267	2000 EM_{147}	—	March 4, 2000	Catalina	CSS	·	5.4 km	MPC · JPL
104268	2000 EA_{148}	—	March 4, 2000	Catalina	CSS	EOS	5.0 km	MPC · JPL
104269	2000 EC_{148}	—	March 4, 2000	Catalina	CSS	·	11 km	MPC · JPL
104270	2000 EC_{149}	—	March 5, 2000	Socorro	LINEAR	·	1.7 km	MPC · JPL
104271	2000 EF_{149}	—	March 5, 2000	Socorro	LINEAR	·	2.8 km	MPC · JPL
104272	2000 ES_{149}	—	March 5, 2000	Socorro	LINEAR	EOS	3.8 km	MPC · JPL
104273	2000 EU_{149}	—	March 5, 2000	Socorro	LINEAR	·	2.7 km	MPC · JPL
104274	2000 EU_{150}	—	March 5, 2000	Haleakala	NEAT	NYS	2.0 km	MPC · JPL
104275	2000 EW_{150}	—	March 5, 2000	Haleakala	NEAT	·	3.0 km	MPC · JPL
104276	2000 EL_{151}	—	March 6, 2000	Socorro	LINEAR	MAR	2.2 km	MPC · JPL
104277	2000 ER_{151}	—	March 6, 2000	Haleakala	NEAT	·	5.4 km	MPC · JPL
104278	2000 EK_{152}	—	March 6, 2000	Haleakala	NEAT	·	2.3 km	MPC · JPL
104279	2000 EE_{153}	—	March 6, 2000	Haleakala	NEAT	KOR	3.2 km	MPC · JPL
104280	2000 ED_{154}	—	March 6, 2000	Haleakala	NEAT	TEL	3.2 km	MPC · JPL
104281	2000 ET_{154}	—	March 6, 2000	Haleakala	NEAT	·	3.2 km	MPC · JPL
104282	2000 EK_{155}	—	March 9, 2000	Socorro	LINEAR	·	1.9 km	MPC · JPL
104283	2000 EL_{155}	—	March 9, 2000	Socorro	LINEAR	EOS	4.1 km	MPC · JPL
104284	2000 EX_{155}	—	March 9, 2000	Socorro	LINEAR	·	2.3 km	MPC · JPL
104285	2000 EH_{156}	—	March 9, 2000	Socorro	LINEAR	EOS	5.6 km	MPC · JPL
104286	2000 EF_{157}	—	March 11, 2000	Catalina	CSS	TIR	6.3 km	MPC · JPL
104287	2000 EM_{157}	—	March 11, 2000	Catalina	CSS	LUT	8.3 km	MPC · JPL
104288	2000 EC_{158}	—	March 12, 2000	Anderson Mesa	LONEOS	·	7.3 km	MPC · JPL
104289	2000 EW_{158}	—	March 12, 2000	Anderson Mesa	LONEOS	·	3.1 km	MPC · JPL
104290	2000 EB_{164}	—	March 3, 2000	Socorro	LINEAR	·	2.4 km	MPC · JPL
104291	2000 EU_{164}	—	March 3, 2000	Socorro	LINEAR	RAF	1.6 km	MPC · JPL
104292	2000 EC_{165}	—	March 3, 2000	Socorro	LINEAR	EOS	3.7 km	MPC · JPL
104293	2000 EN_{166}	—	March 4, 2000	Socorro	LINEAR	·	4.0 km	MPC · JPL
104294	2000 ER_{168}	—	March 4, 2000	Socorro	LINEAR	·	3.9 km	MPC · JPL
104295	2000 EH_{169}	—	March 4, 2000	Socorro	LINEAR	EUN	4.2 km	MPC · JPL
104296	2000 ET_{169}	—	March 4, 2000	Socorro	LINEAR	slow?	6.5 km	MPC · JPL
104297	2000 EK_{171}	—	March 5, 2000	Socorro	LINEAR	MAR	2.4 km	MPC · JPL
104298	2000 EG_{172}	—	March 10, 2000	Socorro	LINEAR	·	1.7 km	MPC · JPL
104299	2000 EM_{173}	—	March 4, 2000	Socorro	LINEAR	·	2.6 km	MPC · JPL
104300	2000 ET_{174}	—	March 1, 2000	Catalina	CSS	·	3.0 km	MPC · JPL

== 104301–104400 ==
back to top

Designation			Discovery			Properties		Ref
Permanent	Provisional	Named after	Date	Site	Discoverer(s)	Category	Diam.	Ref
104301	2000 EZ_{175}	—	March 3, 2000	Socorro	LINEAR	EUN	2.1 km	MPC · JPL
104302	2000 ED_{178}	—	March 4, 2000	Socorro	LINEAR	·	1.6 km	MPC · JPL
104303	2000 EA_{179}	—	March 4, 2000	Socorro	LINEAR	·	6.7 km	MPC · JPL
104304	2000 EM_{179}	—	March 4, 2000	Socorro	LINEAR	·	2.8 km	MPC · JPL
104305	2000 EH_{183}	—	March 5, 2000	Socorro	LINEAR	PHO	2.5 km	MPC · JPL
104306	2000 EM_{185}	—	March 5, 2000	Haleakala	NEAT	·	2.5 km	MPC · JPL
104307	2000 EO_{186}	—	March 2, 2000	Catalina	CSS	TIR	4.2 km	MPC · JPL
104308	2000 ES_{186}	—	March 3, 2000	Kitt Peak	Spacewatch	·	4.2 km	MPC · JPL
104309	2000 EL_{192}	—	March 3, 2000	Socorro	LINEAR	·	5.0 km	MPC · JPL
104310	2000 ER_{194}	—	March 3, 2000	Socorro	LINEAR	PAD	2.6 km	MPC · JPL
104311	2000 EY_{195}	—	March 3, 2000	Socorro	LINEAR	·	2.9 km	MPC · JPL
104312	2000 EQ_{196}	—	March 3, 2000	Socorro	LINEAR	HYG	6.1 km	MPC · JPL
104313	2000 EM_{201}	—	March 15, 2000	Socorro	LINEAR	·	3.7 km	MPC · JPL
104314	2000 EC_{203}	—	March 5, 2000	Cerro Tololo	Deep Lens Survey	·	3.7 km	MPC · JPL
104315	2000 FO	—	March 25, 2000	Kitt Peak	Spacewatch	·	1.8 km	MPC · JPL
104316	2000 FP_{1}	—	March 25, 2000	Kitt Peak	Spacewatch	·	2.8 km	MPC · JPL
104317	2000 FD_{2}	—	March 25, 2000	Kitt Peak	Spacewatch	·	2.5 km	MPC · JPL
104318	2000 FF_{2}	—	March 25, 2000	Kitt Peak	Spacewatch	·	3.7 km	MPC · JPL
104319	2000 FM_{2}	—	March 25, 2000	Kitt Peak	Spacewatch	ADE	5.9 km	MPC · JPL
104320	2000 FP_{2}	—	March 26, 2000	Kitt Peak	Spacewatch	·	1.4 km	MPC · JPL
104321	2000 FD_{3}	—	March 28, 2000	Socorro	LINEAR	(5)	2.3 km	MPC · JPL
104322	2000 FF_{4}	—	March 27, 2000	Kitt Peak	Spacewatch	·	5.8 km	MPC · JPL
104323	2000 FT_{4}	—	March 27, 2000	Kitt Peak	Spacewatch	MAS	1.7 km	MPC · JPL
104324	2000 FX_{4}	—	March 27, 2000	Kitt Peak	Spacewatch	·	3.4 km	MPC · JPL
104325	2000 FM_{6}	—	March 25, 2000	Kitt Peak	Spacewatch	·	3.2 km	MPC · JPL
104326	2000 FU_{6}	—	March 29, 2000	Kitt Peak	Spacewatch	·	5.5 km	MPC · JPL
104327	2000 FA_{7}	—	March 29, 2000	Kitt Peak	Spacewatch	·	2.9 km	MPC · JPL
104328	2000 FW_{7}	—	March 29, 2000	Socorro	LINEAR	·	7.6 km	MPC · JPL
104329	2000 FN_{8}	—	March 25, 2000	Kleť	Klet	·	7.0 km	MPC · JPL
104330	2000 FY_{8}	—	March 29, 2000	Kitt Peak	Spacewatch	·	5.5 km	MPC · JPL
104331	2000 FA_{9}	—	March 29, 2000	Kitt Peak	Spacewatch	HYG	4.5 km	MPC · JPL
104332	2000 FD_{9}	—	March 29, 2000	Kitt Peak	Spacewatch	NYS	2.0 km	MPC · JPL
104333	2000 FO_{9}	—	March 30, 2000	Kitt Peak	Spacewatch	·	2.6 km	MPC · JPL
104334	2000 FF_{10}	—	March 30, 2000	Kitt Peak	Spacewatch	KOR	3.2 km	MPC · JPL
104335	2000 FF_{11}	—	March 28, 2000	Socorro	LINEAR	·	7.7 km	MPC · JPL
104336	2000 FM_{12}	—	March 28, 2000	Socorro	LINEAR	CYB	9.6 km	MPC · JPL
104337	2000 FT_{12}	—	March 28, 2000	Socorro	LINEAR	EUN	3.5 km	MPC · JPL
104338	2000 FA_{13}	—	March 29, 2000	Socorro	LINEAR	·	8.5 km	MPC · JPL
104339	2000 FF_{13}	—	March 29, 2000	Socorro	LINEAR	EUN	3.3 km	MPC · JPL
104340	2000 FN_{13}	—	March 29, 2000	Socorro	LINEAR	·	5.3 km	MPC · JPL
104341	2000 FR_{13}	—	March 29, 2000	Socorro	LINEAR	·	2.6 km	MPC · JPL
104342	2000 FH_{15}	—	March 29, 2000	Socorro	LINEAR	·	3.2 km	MPC · JPL
104343	2000 FW_{15}	—	March 28, 2000	Socorro	LINEAR	·	2.9 km	MPC · JPL
104344	2000 FX_{15}	—	March 28, 2000	Socorro	LINEAR	GEF	2.0 km	MPC · JPL
104345	2000 FD_{16}	—	March 28, 2000	Socorro	LINEAR	·	5.9 km	MPC · JPL
104346	2000 FY_{16}	—	March 28, 2000	Socorro	LINEAR	EUP	6.9 km	MPC · JPL
104347	2000 FZ_{16}	—	March 28, 2000	Socorro	LINEAR	·	1.8 km	MPC · JPL
104348	2000 FL_{17}	—	March 29, 2000	Socorro	LINEAR	MAR	2.4 km	MPC · JPL
104349	2000 FO_{17}	—	March 29, 2000	Socorro	LINEAR	·	1.9 km	MPC · JPL
104350	2000 FB_{18}	—	March 29, 2000	Socorro	LINEAR	BRA	3.7 km	MPC · JPL
104351	2000 FF_{18}	—	March 29, 2000	Socorro	LINEAR	·	3.5 km	MPC · JPL
104352	2000 FP_{18}	—	March 29, 2000	Socorro	LINEAR	·	3.2 km	MPC · JPL
104353	2000 FR_{19}	—	March 29, 2000	Socorro	LINEAR	·	6.4 km	MPC · JPL
104354	2000 FX_{19}	—	March 29, 2000	Socorro	LINEAR	·	4.4 km	MPC · JPL
104355	2000 FF_{20}	—	March 29, 2000	Socorro	LINEAR	·	4.7 km	MPC · JPL
104356	2000 FM_{20}	—	March 29, 2000	Socorro	LINEAR	·	3.1 km	MPC · JPL
104357	2000 FO_{20}	—	March 29, 2000	Socorro	LINEAR	·	2.9 km	MPC · JPL
104358	2000 FT_{20}	—	March 29, 2000	Socorro	LINEAR	·	2.3 km	MPC · JPL
104359	2000 FV_{20}	—	March 29, 2000	Socorro	LINEAR	GEF	2.5 km	MPC · JPL
104360	2000 FK_{21}	—	March 29, 2000	Socorro	LINEAR	·	3.1 km	MPC · JPL
104361	2000 FV_{21}	—	March 29, 2000	Socorro	LINEAR	EOS	4.4 km	MPC · JPL
104362	2000 FS_{22}	—	March 29, 2000	Socorro	LINEAR	NYS	1.5 km	MPC · JPL
104363	2000 FH_{23}	—	March 29, 2000	Socorro	LINEAR	EOS	4.0 km	MPC · JPL
104364	2000 FK_{26}	—	March 27, 2000	Anderson Mesa	LONEOS	HOF	7.1 km	MPC · JPL
104365	2000 FP_{26}	—	March 27, 2000	Anderson Mesa	LONEOS	·	2.2 km	MPC · JPL
104366	2000 FC_{27}	—	March 27, 2000	Anderson Mesa	LONEOS	·	5.0 km	MPC · JPL
104367	2000 FG_{27}	—	March 27, 2000	Anderson Mesa	LONEOS	·	8.0 km	MPC · JPL
104368	2000 FL_{27}	—	March 27, 2000	Anderson Mesa	LONEOS	KOR	2.7 km	MPC · JPL
104369	2000 FT_{27}	—	March 27, 2000	Anderson Mesa	LONEOS	·	3.8 km	MPC · JPL
104370	2000 FV_{27}	—	March 27, 2000	Anderson Mesa	LONEOS	EMA	6.9 km	MPC · JPL
104371	2000 FH_{29}	—	March 27, 2000	Anderson Mesa	LONEOS	·	6.9 km	MPC · JPL
104372	2000 FT_{29}	—	March 27, 2000	Anderson Mesa	LONEOS	HYG	4.8 km	MPC · JPL
104373	2000 FV_{29}	—	March 27, 2000	Anderson Mesa	LONEOS	·	2.1 km	MPC · JPL
104374	2000 FN_{30}	—	March 27, 2000	Anderson Mesa	LONEOS	·	6.6 km	MPC · JPL
104375	2000 FE_{31}	—	March 28, 2000	Socorro	LINEAR	GEF	3.3 km	MPC · JPL
104376	2000 FC_{32}	—	March 29, 2000	Socorro	LINEAR	EOS	4.2 km	MPC · JPL
104377	2000 FF_{32}	—	March 29, 2000	Socorro	LINEAR	HYG	6.4 km	MPC · JPL
104378	2000 FR_{33}	—	March 29, 2000	Socorro	LINEAR	·	4.3 km	MPC · JPL
104379	2000 FB_{34}	—	March 29, 2000	Socorro	LINEAR	·	3.7 km	MPC · JPL
104380	2000 FP_{34}	—	March 29, 2000	Socorro	LINEAR	V	1.4 km	MPC · JPL
104381	2000 FW_{34}	—	March 29, 2000	Socorro	LINEAR	(5)	2.9 km	MPC · JPL
104382	2000 FA_{35}	—	March 29, 2000	Socorro	LINEAR	·	3.0 km	MPC · JPL
104383	2000 FD_{36}	—	March 29, 2000	Socorro	LINEAR	·	5.4 km	MPC · JPL
104384	2000 FF_{36}	—	March 29, 2000	Socorro	LINEAR	·	2.4 km	MPC · JPL
104385	2000 FL_{36}	—	March 29, 2000	Socorro	LINEAR	V	1.8 km	MPC · JPL
104386	2000 FV_{36}	—	March 29, 2000	Socorro	LINEAR	V	1.3 km	MPC · JPL
104387	2000 FY_{36}	—	March 29, 2000	Socorro	LINEAR	·	2.0 km	MPC · JPL
104388	2000 FZ_{36}	—	March 29, 2000	Socorro	LINEAR	EOS	4.4 km	MPC · JPL
104389	2000 FP_{38}	—	March 29, 2000	Socorro	LINEAR	·	4.2 km	MPC · JPL
104390	2000 FR_{38}	—	March 29, 2000	Socorro	LINEAR	·	2.5 km	MPC · JPL
104391	2000 FX_{38}	—	March 29, 2000	Socorro	LINEAR	·	2.6 km	MPC · JPL
104392	2000 FW_{39}	—	March 29, 2000	Socorro	LINEAR	slow	6.0 km	MPC · JPL
104393	2000 FC_{41}	—	March 29, 2000	Socorro	LINEAR	·	8.0 km	MPC · JPL
104394	2000 FO_{41}	—	March 29, 2000	Socorro	LINEAR	·	3.2 km	MPC · JPL
104395	2000 FW_{41}	—	March 29, 2000	Socorro	LINEAR	·	4.9 km	MPC · JPL
104396	2000 FC_{42}	—	March 29, 2000	Socorro	LINEAR	·	3.7 km	MPC · JPL
104397	2000 FN_{43}	—	March 29, 2000	Socorro	LINEAR	·	4.7 km	MPC · JPL
104398	2000 FC_{44}	—	March 29, 2000	Socorro	LINEAR	·	2.3 km	MPC · JPL
104399	2000 FB_{45}	—	March 29, 2000	Socorro	LINEAR	·	3.6 km	MPC · JPL
104400	2000 FO_{45}	—	March 29, 2000	Socorro	LINEAR	·	1.6 km	MPC · JPL

== 104401–104500 ==
back to top

Designation			Discovery			Properties		Ref
Permanent	Provisional	Named after	Date	Site	Discoverer(s)	Category	Diam.	Ref
104401	2000 FY_{45}	—	March 29, 2000	Socorro	LINEAR	·	3.4 km	MPC · JPL
104402	2000 FU_{46}	—	March 29, 2000	Socorro	LINEAR	·	2.5 km	MPC · JPL
104403	2000 FG_{47}	—	March 29, 2000	Socorro	LINEAR	·	2.4 km	MPC · JPL
104404	2000 FH_{47}	—	March 29, 2000	Socorro	LINEAR	ADE	6.6 km	MPC · JPL
104405	2000 FJ_{48}	—	March 29, 2000	Socorro	LINEAR	·	3.1 km	MPC · JPL
104406	2000 FN_{51}	—	March 29, 2000	Kitt Peak	Spacewatch	·	5.0 km	MPC · JPL
104407	2000 FP_{51}	—	March 29, 2000	Kitt Peak	Spacewatch	·	3.4 km	MPC · JPL
104408	2000 FD_{52}	—	March 29, 2000	Kitt Peak	Spacewatch	·	3.2 km	MPC · JPL
104409	2000 FM_{55}	—	March 29, 2000	Socorro	LINEAR	KOR	2.8 km	MPC · JPL
104410	2000 FF_{56}	—	March 29, 2000	Socorro	LINEAR	·	1.6 km	MPC · JPL
104411	2000 FM_{56}	—	March 29, 2000	Socorro	LINEAR	·	2.5 km	MPC · JPL
104412	2000 FT_{56}	—	March 29, 2000	Socorro	LINEAR	·	2.1 km	MPC · JPL
104413	2000 FV_{56}	—	March 29, 2000	Socorro	LINEAR	·	4.6 km	MPC · JPL
104414	2000 FZ_{56}	—	March 30, 2000	Catalina	CSS	EOS	5.7 km	MPC · JPL
104415	2000 FG_{57}	—	March 26, 2000	Anderson Mesa	LONEOS	KOR	3.1 km	MPC · JPL
104416	2000 FS_{57}	—	March 26, 2000	Anderson Mesa	LONEOS	VER	5.1 km	MPC · JPL
104417	2000 FX_{57}	—	March 26, 2000	Anderson Mesa	LONEOS	·	4.0 km	MPC · JPL
104418	2000 FB_{58}	—	March 26, 2000	Anderson Mesa	LONEOS	·	4.2 km	MPC · JPL
104419	2000 FN_{58}	—	March 27, 2000	Anderson Mesa	LONEOS	·	3.3 km	MPC · JPL
104420	2000 FY_{58}	—	March 26, 2000	Anderson Mesa	LONEOS	·	3.4 km	MPC · JPL
104421	2000 FG_{59}	—	March 29, 2000	Socorro	LINEAR	·	3.8 km	MPC · JPL
104422	2000 FJ_{59}	—	March 29, 2000	Socorro	LINEAR	·	4.3 km	MPC · JPL
104423	2000 FA_{60}	—	March 29, 2000	Socorro	LINEAR	·	4.4 km	MPC · JPL
104424	2000 FS_{60}	—	March 29, 2000	Socorro	LINEAR	EOS	3.9 km	MPC · JPL
104425	2000 FK_{61}	—	March 29, 2000	Socorro	LINEAR	·	5.6 km	MPC · JPL
104426	2000 FR_{61}	—	March 29, 2000	Socorro	LINEAR	·	2.7 km	MPC · JPL
104427	2000 FE_{62}	—	March 26, 2000	Anderson Mesa	LONEOS	EOS	4.6 km	MPC · JPL
104428	2000 FK_{62}	—	March 26, 2000	Anderson Mesa	LONEOS	·	6.9 km	MPC · JPL
104429	2000 FE_{63}	—	March 27, 2000	Anderson Mesa	LONEOS	·	5.6 km	MPC · JPL
104430	2000 FD_{64}	—	March 29, 2000	Socorro	LINEAR	HOF	4.8 km	MPC · JPL
104431	2000 FP_{64}	—	March 30, 2000	Socorro	LINEAR	slow	3.0 km	MPC · JPL
104432	2000 FX_{64}	—	March 30, 2000	Socorro	LINEAR	EOS	4.3 km	MPC · JPL
104433	2000 FP_{66}	—	March 30, 2000	Kitt Peak	Spacewatch	KOR	1.7 km	MPC · JPL
104434	2000 FT_{66}	—	March 25, 2000	Kitt Peak	Spacewatch	·	2.1 km	MPC · JPL
104435	2000 FD_{67}	—	March 25, 2000	Kitt Peak	Spacewatch	·	2.7 km	MPC · JPL
104436	2000 FG_{68}	—	March 25, 2000	Kitt Peak	Spacewatch	slow	6.1 km	MPC · JPL
104437	2000 FL_{72}	—	March 25, 2000	Kitt Peak	Spacewatch	·	2.6 km	MPC · JPL
104438	2000 FH_{73}	—	March 25, 2000	Kitt Peak	Spacewatch	·	3.7 km	MPC · JPL
104439	2000 FW_{73}	—	March 26, 2000	Anderson Mesa	LONEOS	NAE	5.7 km	MPC · JPL
104440	2000 FC_{74}	—	March 31, 2000	Kvistaberg	Uppsala-DLR Asteroid Survey	·	4.6 km	MPC · JPL
104441	2000 GQ	—	April 1, 2000	Kitt Peak	Spacewatch	KOR	3.7 km	MPC · JPL
104442	2000 GB_{1}	—	April 2, 2000	Socorro	LINEAR	H	990 m	MPC · JPL
104443	2000 GS_{2}	—	April 3, 2000	Socorro	LINEAR	EOS	5.4 km	MPC · JPL
104444	2000 GR_{3}	—	April 5, 2000	Socorro	LINEAR	·	2.5 km	MPC · JPL
104445	2000 GA_{4}	—	April 7, 2000	Prescott	P. G. Comba	·	4.0 km	MPC · JPL
104446	2000 GT_{4}	—	April 5, 2000	Socorro	LINEAR	H	1.3 km	MPC · JPL
104447	2000 GP_{5}	—	April 4, 2000	Socorro	LINEAR	·	2.0 km	MPC · JPL
104448	2000 GE_{6}	—	April 4, 2000	Socorro	LINEAR	·	3.1 km	MPC · JPL
104449	2000 GK_{6}	—	April 4, 2000	Socorro	LINEAR	·	2.9 km	MPC · JPL
104450	2000 GT_{6}	—	April 4, 2000	Socorro	LINEAR	EOS	4.4 km	MPC · JPL
104451	2000 GJ_{7}	—	April 4, 2000	Socorro	LINEAR	·	3.3 km	MPC · JPL
104452	2000 GK_{7}	—	April 4, 2000	Socorro	LINEAR	615	3.3 km	MPC · JPL
104453	2000 GS_{7}	—	April 4, 2000	Socorro	LINEAR	·	7.3 km	MPC · JPL
104454	2000 GU_{7}	—	April 4, 2000	Socorro	LINEAR	·	3.8 km	MPC · JPL
104455	2000 GC_{8}	—	April 5, 2000	Socorro	LINEAR	·	2.7 km	MPC · JPL
104456	2000 GG_{8}	—	April 5, 2000	Socorro	LINEAR	MAS	1.3 km	MPC · JPL
104457	2000 GL_{8}	—	April 5, 2000	Socorro	LINEAR	·	1.3 km	MPC · JPL
104458	2000 GG_{9}	—	April 5, 2000	Socorro	LINEAR	·	3.5 km	MPC · JPL
104459	2000 GJ_{9}	—	April 5, 2000	Socorro	LINEAR	·	2.0 km	MPC · JPL
104460	2000 GF_{10}	—	April 5, 2000	Socorro	LINEAR	AST	3.5 km	MPC · JPL
104461	2000 GL_{10}	—	April 5, 2000	Socorro	LINEAR	·	2.7 km	MPC · JPL
104462	2000 GO_{10}	—	April 5, 2000	Socorro	LINEAR	EOS	4.7 km	MPC · JPL
104463	2000 GW_{12}	—	April 5, 2000	Socorro	LINEAR	HOF	5.8 km	MPC · JPL
104464	2000 GR_{13}	—	April 5, 2000	Socorro	LINEAR	·	7.1 km	MPC · JPL
104465	2000 GS_{13}	—	April 5, 2000	Socorro	LINEAR	MAS	1.1 km	MPC · JPL
104466	2000 GK_{14}	—	April 5, 2000	Socorro	LINEAR	·	5.9 km	MPC · JPL
104467	2000 GR_{14}	—	April 5, 2000	Socorro	LINEAR	·	1.6 km	MPC · JPL
104468	2000 GN_{15}	—	April 5, 2000	Socorro	LINEAR	·	2.6 km	MPC · JPL
104469	2000 GS_{15}	—	April 5, 2000	Socorro	LINEAR	·	1.5 km	MPC · JPL
104470	2000 GW_{15}	—	April 5, 2000	Socorro	LINEAR	BRA	3.2 km	MPC · JPL
104471	2000 GO_{16}	—	April 5, 2000	Socorro	LINEAR	·	2.2 km	MPC · JPL
104472	2000 GF_{17}	—	April 5, 2000	Socorro	LINEAR	KOR	2.7 km	MPC · JPL
104473	2000 GV_{18}	—	April 5, 2000	Socorro	LINEAR	·	8.0 km	MPC · JPL
104474	2000 GA_{20}	—	April 5, 2000	Socorro	LINEAR	KOR	2.8 km	MPC · JPL
104475	2000 GB_{20}	—	April 5, 2000	Socorro	LINEAR	MAS	1.0 km	MPC · JPL
104476	2000 GO_{20}	—	April 5, 2000	Socorro	LINEAR	·	2.7 km	MPC · JPL
104477	2000 GE_{21}	—	April 5, 2000	Socorro	LINEAR	·	2.5 km	MPC · JPL
104478	2000 GJ_{21}	—	April 5, 2000	Socorro	LINEAR	·	5.0 km	MPC · JPL
104479	2000 GC_{22}	—	April 5, 2000	Socorro	LINEAR	THM	5.5 km	MPC · JPL
104480	2000 GT_{22}	—	April 5, 2000	Socorro	LINEAR	·	5.1 km	MPC · JPL
104481	2000 GF_{23}	—	April 5, 2000	Socorro	LINEAR	·	5.0 km	MPC · JPL
104482	2000 GK_{23}	—	April 5, 2000	Socorro	LINEAR	·	6.2 km	MPC · JPL
104483	2000 GU_{23}	—	April 5, 2000	Socorro	LINEAR	·	3.2 km	MPC · JPL
104484	2000 GQ_{24}	—	April 5, 2000	Socorro	LINEAR	·	2.6 km	MPC · JPL
104485	2000 GJ_{25}	—	April 5, 2000	Socorro	LINEAR	KOR	2.8 km	MPC · JPL
104486	2000 GX_{25}	—	April 5, 2000	Socorro	LINEAR	·	4.5 km	MPC · JPL
104487	2000 GO_{26}	—	April 5, 2000	Socorro	LINEAR	KOR	3.5 km	MPC · JPL
104488	2000 GQ_{28}	—	April 5, 2000	Socorro	LINEAR	NYS	2.0 km	MPC · JPL
104489	2000 GT_{28}	—	April 5, 2000	Socorro	LINEAR	·	2.2 km	MPC · JPL
104490	2000 GZ_{28}	—	April 5, 2000	Socorro	LINEAR	·	4.7 km	MPC · JPL
104491	2000 GK_{30}	—	April 5, 2000	Socorro	LINEAR	·	2.9 km	MPC · JPL
104492	2000 GQ_{30}	—	April 5, 2000	Socorro	LINEAR	KOR	3.0 km	MPC · JPL
104493	2000 GX_{30}	—	April 5, 2000	Socorro	LINEAR	·	3.1 km	MPC · JPL
104494	2000 GA_{31}	—	April 5, 2000	Socorro	LINEAR	·	1.7 km	MPC · JPL
104495	2000 GK_{32}	—	April 5, 2000	Socorro	LINEAR	·	2.3 km	MPC · JPL
104496	2000 GK_{33}	—	April 5, 2000	Socorro	LINEAR	·	3.4 km	MPC · JPL
104497	2000 GC_{35}	—	April 5, 2000	Socorro	LINEAR	KOR	3.6 km	MPC · JPL
104498	2000 GJ_{35}	—	April 5, 2000	Socorro	LINEAR	·	3.8 km	MPC · JPL
104499	2000 GH_{36}	—	April 5, 2000	Socorro	LINEAR	·	5.1 km	MPC · JPL
104500	2000 GQ_{36}	—	April 5, 2000	Socorro	LINEAR	KOR	3.8 km	MPC · JPL

== 104501–104600 ==
back to top

Designation			Discovery			Properties		Ref
Permanent	Provisional	Named after	Date	Site	Discoverer(s)	Category	Diam.	Ref
104501	2000 GM_{38}	—	April 5, 2000	Socorro	LINEAR	·	1.5 km	MPC · JPL
104502	2000 GT_{38}	—	April 5, 2000	Socorro	LINEAR	BRA	3.4 km	MPC · JPL
104503	2000 GW_{38}	—	April 5, 2000	Socorro	LINEAR	·	2.5 km	MPC · JPL
104504	2000 GA_{39}	—	April 5, 2000	Socorro	LINEAR	·	3.5 km	MPC · JPL
104505	2000 GR_{39}	—	April 5, 2000	Socorro	LINEAR	ADE · slow	6.1 km	MPC · JPL
104506	2000 GH_{40}	—	April 5, 2000	Socorro	LINEAR	·	4.3 km	MPC · JPL
104507	2000 GW_{40}	—	April 5, 2000	Socorro	LINEAR	·	4.3 km	MPC · JPL
104508	2000 GM_{41}	—	April 5, 2000	Socorro	LINEAR	·	2.1 km	MPC · JPL
104509	2000 GR_{41}	—	April 5, 2000	Socorro	LINEAR	·	3.0 km	MPC · JPL
104510	2000 GD_{43}	—	April 5, 2000	Socorro	LINEAR	EOS	3.2 km	MPC · JPL
104511	2000 GK_{43}	—	April 5, 2000	Socorro	LINEAR	EOS	4.8 km	MPC · JPL
104512	2000 GO_{43}	—	April 5, 2000	Socorro	LINEAR	·	3.9 km	MPC · JPL
104513	2000 GZ_{43}	—	April 5, 2000	Socorro	LINEAR	·	5.2 km	MPC · JPL
104514	2000 GJ_{45}	—	April 5, 2000	Socorro	LINEAR	·	4.7 km	MPC · JPL
104515	2000 GT_{45}	—	April 5, 2000	Socorro	LINEAR	·	1.2 km	MPC · JPL
104516	2000 GF_{46}	—	April 5, 2000	Socorro	LINEAR	·	6.3 km	MPC · JPL
104517	2000 GG_{47}	—	April 5, 2000	Socorro	LINEAR	·	3.0 km	MPC · JPL
104518	2000 GO_{47}	—	April 5, 2000	Socorro	LINEAR	·	3.0 km	MPC · JPL
104519	2000 GS_{47}	—	April 5, 2000	Socorro	LINEAR	·	5.0 km	MPC · JPL
104520	2000 GW_{47}	—	April 5, 2000	Socorro	LINEAR	·	7.5 km	MPC · JPL
104521	2000 GP_{49}	—	April 5, 2000	Socorro	LINEAR	·	4.1 km	MPC · JPL
104522	2000 GQ_{49}	—	April 5, 2000	Socorro	LINEAR	·	1.7 km	MPC · JPL
104523	2000 GE_{50}	—	April 5, 2000	Socorro	LINEAR	·	5.9 km	MPC · JPL
104524	2000 GX_{50}	—	April 5, 2000	Socorro	LINEAR	THM	6.6 km	MPC · JPL
104525	2000 GA_{51}	—	April 5, 2000	Socorro	LINEAR	EOS	2.9 km	MPC · JPL
104526	2000 GE_{51}	—	April 5, 2000	Socorro	LINEAR	KON	3.9 km	MPC · JPL
104527	2000 GS_{51}	—	April 5, 2000	Socorro	LINEAR	·	3.4 km	MPC · JPL
104528	2000 GE_{52}	—	April 5, 2000	Socorro	LINEAR	NYS	2.8 km	MPC · JPL
104529	2000 GH_{52}	—	April 5, 2000	Socorro	LINEAR	·	4.0 km	MPC · JPL
104530	2000 GZ_{52}	—	April 5, 2000	Socorro	LINEAR	·	6.1 km	MPC · JPL
104531	2000 GK_{53}	—	April 5, 2000	Socorro	LINEAR	·	1.8 km	MPC · JPL
104532	2000 GJ_{54}	—	April 5, 2000	Socorro	LINEAR	MAS	1.1 km	MPC · JPL
104533	2000 GK_{54}	—	April 5, 2000	Socorro	LINEAR	·	6.9 km	MPC · JPL
104534	2000 GN_{54}	—	April 5, 2000	Socorro	LINEAR	·	3.9 km	MPC · JPL
104535	2000 GY_{54}	—	April 5, 2000	Socorro	LINEAR	MAS	1.1 km	MPC · JPL
104536	2000 GT_{55}	—	April 5, 2000	Socorro	LINEAR	·	2.7 km	MPC · JPL
104537	2000 GY_{55}	—	April 5, 2000	Socorro	LINEAR	·	2.6 km	MPC · JPL
104538	2000 GJ_{56}	—	April 5, 2000	Socorro	LINEAR	NYS	2.4 km	MPC · JPL
104539	2000 GU_{56}	—	April 5, 2000	Socorro	LINEAR	·	2.0 km	MPC · JPL
104540	2000 GF_{57}	—	April 5, 2000	Socorro	LINEAR	·	7.9 km	MPC · JPL
104541	2000 GD_{58}	—	April 5, 2000	Socorro	LINEAR	·	4.8 km	MPC · JPL
104542	2000 GU_{58}	—	April 5, 2000	Socorro	LINEAR	·	6.8 km	MPC · JPL
104543	2000 GX_{58}	—	April 5, 2000	Socorro	LINEAR	MAS	1.2 km	MPC · JPL
104544	2000 GG_{59}	—	April 5, 2000	Socorro	LINEAR	·	3.9 km	MPC · JPL
104545	2000 GJ_{59}	—	April 5, 2000	Socorro	LINEAR	KOR	2.8 km	MPC · JPL
104546	2000 GS_{60}	—	April 5, 2000	Socorro	LINEAR	·	1.8 km	MPC · JPL
104547	2000 GV_{61}	—	April 5, 2000	Socorro	LINEAR	HYG	5.9 km	MPC · JPL
104548	2000 GS_{62}	—	April 5, 2000	Socorro	LINEAR	THM	4.1 km	MPC · JPL
104549	2000 GV_{62}	—	April 5, 2000	Socorro	LINEAR	·	4.5 km	MPC · JPL
104550	2000 GH_{63}	—	April 5, 2000	Socorro	LINEAR	·	3.5 km	MPC · JPL
104551	2000 GU_{63}	—	April 5, 2000	Socorro	LINEAR	·	5.0 km	MPC · JPL
104552	2000 GZ_{63}	—	April 5, 2000	Socorro	LINEAR	·	4.0 km	MPC · JPL
104553	2000 GC_{64}	—	April 5, 2000	Socorro	LINEAR	·	3.5 km	MPC · JPL
104554	2000 GM_{65}	—	April 5, 2000	Socorro	LINEAR	·	5.0 km	MPC · JPL
104555	2000 GP_{65}	—	April 5, 2000	Socorro	LINEAR	·	3.5 km	MPC · JPL
104556	2000 GR_{67}	—	April 5, 2000	Socorro	LINEAR	·	2.3 km	MPC · JPL
104557	2000 GH_{68}	—	April 5, 2000	Socorro	LINEAR	·	5.5 km	MPC · JPL
104558	2000 GQ_{68}	—	April 5, 2000	Socorro	LINEAR	·	2.9 km	MPC · JPL
104559	2000 GZ_{70}	—	April 5, 2000	Socorro	LINEAR	·	2.8 km	MPC · JPL
104560	2000 GK_{71}	—	April 5, 2000	Socorro	LINEAR	·	2.1 km	MPC · JPL
104561	2000 GS_{71}	—	April 5, 2000	Socorro	LINEAR	·	4.3 km	MPC · JPL
104562	2000 GY_{71}	—	April 5, 2000	Socorro	LINEAR	V	1.3 km	MPC · JPL
104563	2000 GL_{72}	—	April 5, 2000	Socorro	LINEAR	NYS	2.0 km	MPC · JPL
104564	2000 GO_{72}	—	April 5, 2000	Socorro	LINEAR	·	5.2 km	MPC · JPL
104565	2000 GZ_{72}	—	April 5, 2000	Socorro	LINEAR	·	3.9 km	MPC · JPL
104566	2000 GX_{74}	—	April 5, 2000	Socorro	LINEAR	·	7.8 km	MPC · JPL
104567	2000 GC_{75}	—	April 5, 2000	Socorro	LINEAR	·	7.7 km	MPC · JPL
104568	2000 GF_{75}	—	April 5, 2000	Socorro	LINEAR	·	4.0 km	MPC · JPL
104569	2000 GP_{75}	—	April 5, 2000	Socorro	LINEAR	(1298)	6.6 km	MPC · JPL
104570	2000 GN_{77}	—	April 5, 2000	Socorro	LINEAR	·	3.5 km	MPC · JPL
104571	2000 GF_{78}	—	April 5, 2000	Socorro	LINEAR	NYS	2.4 km	MPC · JPL
104572	2000 GG_{78}	—	April 5, 2000	Socorro	LINEAR	·	3.7 km	MPC · JPL
104573	2000 GK_{78}	—	April 5, 2000	Socorro	LINEAR	·	5.4 km	MPC · JPL
104574	2000 GQ_{78}	—	April 5, 2000	Socorro	LINEAR	LIX	5.1 km	MPC · JPL
104575	2000 GX_{78}	—	April 5, 2000	Socorro	LINEAR	·	4.0 km	MPC · JPL
104576	2000 GG_{80}	—	April 6, 2000	Socorro	LINEAR	·	4.6 km	MPC · JPL
104577	2000 GM_{80}	—	April 6, 2000	Socorro	LINEAR	V	1.4 km	MPC · JPL
104578	2000 GV_{80}	—	April 6, 2000	Socorro	LINEAR	·	4.0 km	MPC · JPL
104579	2000 GW_{80}	—	April 6, 2000	Socorro	LINEAR	·	3.7 km	MPC · JPL
104580	2000 GG_{81}	—	April 6, 2000	Socorro	LINEAR	·	3.1 km	MPC · JPL
104581	2000 GA_{82}	—	April 7, 2000	Socorro	LINEAR	H	1.6 km	MPC · JPL
104582	2000 GX_{83}	—	April 3, 2000	Socorro	LINEAR	·	5.3 km	MPC · JPL
104583	2000 GF_{84}	—	April 3, 2000	Socorro	LINEAR	TEL	3.8 km	MPC · JPL
104584	2000 GK_{84}	—	April 3, 2000	Socorro	LINEAR	·	3.5 km	MPC · JPL
104585	2000 GW_{84}	—	April 3, 2000	Socorro	LINEAR	·	3.0 km	MPC · JPL
104586	2000 GP_{85}	—	April 3, 2000	Socorro	LINEAR	·	2.8 km	MPC · JPL
104587	2000 GX_{85}	—	April 4, 2000	Socorro	LINEAR	·	1.6 km	MPC · JPL
104588	2000 GG_{86}	—	April 4, 2000	Socorro	LINEAR	·	7.5 km	MPC · JPL
104589	2000 GT_{86}	—	April 4, 2000	Socorro	LINEAR	·	3.5 km	MPC · JPL
104590	2000 GC_{87}	—	April 4, 2000	Socorro	LINEAR	(159)	6.2 km	MPC · JPL
104591	2000 GJ_{87}	—	April 4, 2000	Socorro	LINEAR	·	3.1 km	MPC · JPL
104592	2000 GJ_{89}	—	April 4, 2000	Socorro	LINEAR	·	2.2 km	MPC · JPL
104593	2000 GK_{89}	—	April 4, 2000	Socorro	LINEAR	·	4.1 km	MPC · JPL
104594	2000 GA_{90}	—	April 4, 2000	Socorro	LINEAR	·	4.3 km	MPC · JPL
104595	2000 GF_{91}	—	April 4, 2000	Socorro	LINEAR	ADE	7.6 km	MPC · JPL
104596	2000 GL_{91}	—	April 4, 2000	Socorro	LINEAR	EUP	10 km	MPC · JPL
104597	2000 GJ_{92}	—	April 5, 2000	Socorro	LINEAR	·	2.1 km	MPC · JPL
104598	2000 GW_{92}	—	April 5, 2000	Socorro	LINEAR	·	4.2 km	MPC · JPL
104599	2000 GA_{94}	—	April 5, 2000	Socorro	LINEAR	·	3.9 km	MPC · JPL
104600	2000 GP_{94}	—	April 5, 2000	Socorro	LINEAR	·	4.8 km	MPC · JPL

== 104601–104700 ==
back to top

Designation			Discovery			Properties		Ref
Permanent	Provisional	Named after	Date	Site	Discoverer(s)	Category	Diam.	Ref
104601	2000 GG_{97}	—	April 7, 2000	Socorro	LINEAR	·	2.0 km	MPC · JPL
104602	2000 GP_{97}	—	April 7, 2000	Socorro	LINEAR	·	3.2 km	MPC · JPL
104603	2000 GQ_{97}	—	April 7, 2000	Socorro	LINEAR	KOR	3.5 km	MPC · JPL
104604	2000 GU_{97}	—	April 7, 2000	Socorro	LINEAR	·	1.8 km	MPC · JPL
104605	2000 GQ_{99}	—	April 7, 2000	Socorro	LINEAR	·	3.2 km	MPC · JPL
104606	2000 GS_{99}	—	April 7, 2000	Socorro	LINEAR	·	8.8 km	MPC · JPL
104607	2000 GF_{100}	—	April 7, 2000	Socorro	LINEAR	·	1.4 km	MPC · JPL
104608	2000 GG_{100}	—	April 7, 2000	Socorro	LINEAR	·	3.5 km	MPC · JPL
104609	2000 GT_{100}	—	April 7, 2000	Socorro	LINEAR	·	2.9 km	MPC · JPL
104610	2000 GG_{101}	—	April 7, 2000	Socorro	LINEAR	·	3.8 km	MPC · JPL
104611	2000 GZ_{101}	—	April 7, 2000	Socorro	LINEAR	·	3.0 km	MPC · JPL
104612	2000 GE_{103}	—	April 7, 2000	Socorro	LINEAR	·	6.0 km	MPC · JPL
104613	2000 GO_{103}	—	April 7, 2000	Socorro	LINEAR	NYS	2.3 km	MPC · JPL
104614	2000 GD_{104}	—	April 7, 2000	Socorro	LINEAR	NYS ·	4.3 km	MPC · JPL
104615	2000 GH_{105}	—	April 7, 2000	Socorro	LINEAR	·	5.2 km	MPC · JPL
104616	2000 GF_{108}	—	April 7, 2000	Socorro	LINEAR	·	4.1 km	MPC · JPL
104617	2000 GX_{109}	—	April 2, 2000	Anderson Mesa	LONEOS	PHO	2.0 km	MPC · JPL
104618	2000 GZ_{109}	—	April 2, 2000	Anderson Mesa	LONEOS	·	4.4 km	MPC · JPL
104619	2000 GJ_{110}	—	April 2, 2000	Anderson Mesa	LONEOS	·	3.3 km	MPC · JPL
104620	2000 GR_{110}	—	April 2, 2000	Anderson Mesa	LONEOS	·	2.4 km	MPC · JPL
104621	2000 GX_{110}	—	April 2, 2000	Anderson Mesa	LONEOS	·	3.7 km	MPC · JPL
104622	2000 GA_{111}	—	April 2, 2000	Anderson Mesa	LONEOS	·	1.7 km	MPC · JPL
104623	2000 GN_{111}	—	April 3, 2000	Anderson Mesa	LONEOS	EOS	4.2 km	MPC · JPL
104624	2000 GD_{112}	—	April 3, 2000	Anderson Mesa	LONEOS	·	4.5 km	MPC · JPL
104625	2000 GE_{112}	—	April 3, 2000	Anderson Mesa	LONEOS	·	1.0 km	MPC · JPL
104626	2000 GT_{112}	—	April 5, 2000	Socorro	LINEAR	JUN	3.9 km	MPC · JPL
104627	2000 GY_{112}	—	April 5, 2000	Socorro	LINEAR	·	5.3 km	MPC · JPL
104628	2000 GH_{113}	—	April 6, 2000	Socorro	LINEAR	·	5.4 km	MPC · JPL
104629	2000 GV_{113}	—	April 7, 2000	Socorro	LINEAR	·	4.1 km	MPC · JPL
104630	2000 GF_{114}	—	April 7, 2000	Socorro	LINEAR	·	3.7 km	MPC · JPL
104631	2000 GQ_{114}	—	April 7, 2000	Socorro	LINEAR	·	3.2 km	MPC · JPL
104632	2000 GC_{115}	—	April 8, 2000	Socorro	LINEAR	·	4.6 km	MPC · JPL
104633	2000 GV_{115}	—	April 8, 2000	Socorro	LINEAR	·	2.6 km	MPC · JPL
104634	2000 GU_{116}	—	April 2, 2000	Kitt Peak	Spacewatch	EOS	3.6 km	MPC · JPL
104635	2000 GD_{117}	—	April 2, 2000	Kitt Peak	Spacewatch	·	4.3 km	MPC · JPL
104636	2000 GK_{117}	—	April 2, 2000	Kitt Peak	Spacewatch	·	3.5 km	MPC · JPL
104637	2000 GU_{117}	—	April 2, 2000	Kitt Peak	Spacewatch	·	4.0 km	MPC · JPL
104638	2000 GW_{117}	—	April 2, 2000	Kitt Peak	Spacewatch	KOR	2.4 km	MPC · JPL
104639	2000 GY_{118}	—	April 3, 2000	Kitt Peak	Spacewatch	KOR	3.0 km	MPC · JPL
104640	2000 GB_{119}	—	April 3, 2000	Kitt Peak	Spacewatch	HOF	4.6 km	MPC · JPL
104641	2000 GD_{120}	—	April 5, 2000	Kitt Peak	Spacewatch	NYS	1.3 km	MPC · JPL
104642	2000 GO_{122}	—	April 6, 2000	Bergisch Gladbach	W. Bickel	·	3.5 km	MPC · JPL
104643	2000 GY_{122}	—	April 4, 2000	Socorro	LINEAR	H	1.3 km	MPC · JPL
104644	2000 GG_{123}	—	April 11, 2000	Prescott	P. G. Comba	·	2.2 km	MPC · JPL
104645	2000 GT_{125}	—	April 7, 2000	Socorro	LINEAR	·	7.3 km	MPC · JPL
104646	2000 GY_{125}	—	April 7, 2000	Socorro	LINEAR	·	4.9 km	MPC · JPL
104647	2000 GK_{126}	—	April 7, 2000	Socorro	LINEAR	·	3.6 km	MPC · JPL
104648	2000 GQ_{129}	—	April 5, 2000	Kitt Peak	Spacewatch	·	3.1 km	MPC · JPL
104649	2000 GG_{132}	—	April 10, 2000	Kitt Peak	Spacewatch	·	1.9 km	MPC · JPL
104650	2000 GY_{132}	—	April 9, 2000	Ondřejov	P. Kušnirák, Babiaková, U.	·	2.3 km	MPC · JPL
104651	2000 GF_{133}	—	April 12, 2000	Haleakala	NEAT	H	1.1 km	MPC · JPL
104652	2000 GY_{133}	—	April 7, 2000	Socorro	LINEAR	·	8.5 km	MPC · JPL
104653	2000 GB_{134}	—	April 7, 2000	Socorro	LINEAR	·	9.1 km	MPC · JPL
104654	2000 GS_{134}	—	April 8, 2000	Socorro	LINEAR	·	2.2 km	MPC · JPL
104655	2000 GD_{135}	—	April 8, 2000	Socorro	LINEAR	·	4.7 km	MPC · JPL
104656	2000 GH_{135}	—	April 8, 2000	Socorro	LINEAR	·	4.5 km	MPC · JPL
104657	2000 GJ_{135}	—	April 8, 2000	Socorro	LINEAR	·	4.5 km	MPC · JPL
104658	2000 GQ_{136}	—	April 12, 2000	Socorro	LINEAR	·	3.5 km	MPC · JPL
104659	2000 GJ_{137}	—	April 12, 2000	Socorro	LINEAR	EUN	4.7 km	MPC · JPL
104660	2000 GR_{138}	—	April 4, 2000	Anderson Mesa	LONEOS	·	3.4 km	MPC · JPL
104661	2000 GA_{139}	—	April 4, 2000	Anderson Mesa	LONEOS	·	2.8 km	MPC · JPL
104662	2000 GB_{139}	—	April 4, 2000	Anderson Mesa	LONEOS	·	5.4 km	MPC · JPL
104663	2000 GW_{139}	—	April 4, 2000	Anderson Mesa	LONEOS	HYG	8.4 km	MPC · JPL
104664	2000 GZ_{139}	—	April 4, 2000	Anderson Mesa	LONEOS	MRX	2.4 km	MPC · JPL
104665	2000 GQ_{140}	—	April 4, 2000	Anderson Mesa	LONEOS	THM	3.8 km	MPC · JPL
104666	2000 GF_{141}	—	April 6, 2000	Anderson Mesa	LONEOS	·	5.4 km	MPC · JPL
104667	2000 GX_{141}	—	April 7, 2000	Anderson Mesa	LONEOS	URS	5.8 km	MPC · JPL
104668	2000 GB_{142}	—	April 7, 2000	Anderson Mesa	LONEOS	EUN	2.8 km	MPC · JPL
104669	2000 GV_{142}	—	April 7, 2000	Anderson Mesa	LONEOS	·	5.2 km	MPC · JPL
104670	2000 GW_{143}	—	April 7, 2000	Anderson Mesa	LONEOS	·	3.8 km	MPC · JPL
104671	2000 GW_{144}	—	April 7, 2000	Kitt Peak	Spacewatch	THM	3.9 km	MPC · JPL
104672	2000 GC_{146}	—	April 12, 2000	Kitt Peak	Spacewatch	THM	7.1 km	MPC · JPL
104673	2000 GO_{146}	—	April 8, 2000	Kitt Peak	Spacewatch	·	3.0 km	MPC · JPL
104674	2000 GK_{148}	—	April 5, 2000	Socorro	LINEAR	·	6.0 km	MPC · JPL
104675	2000 GB_{149}	—	April 5, 2000	Socorro	LINEAR	·	2.5 km	MPC · JPL
104676	2000 GL_{149}	—	April 5, 2000	Socorro	LINEAR	·	3.9 km	MPC · JPL
104677	2000 GW_{150}	—	April 5, 2000	Socorro	LINEAR	·	6.2 km	MPC · JPL
104678	2000 GB_{152}	—	April 6, 2000	Kitt Peak	Spacewatch	KOR	3.1 km	MPC · JPL
104679	2000 GY_{152}	—	April 6, 2000	Anderson Mesa	LONEOS	·	4.7 km	MPC · JPL
104680	2000 GK_{153}	—	April 6, 2000	Anderson Mesa	LONEOS	·	7.0 km	MPC · JPL
104681	2000 GM_{153}	—	April 6, 2000	Anderson Mesa	LONEOS	·	8.7 km	MPC · JPL
104682	2000 GB_{154}	—	April 6, 2000	Anderson Mesa	LONEOS	·	5.6 km	MPC · JPL
104683	2000 GF_{154}	—	April 6, 2000	Anderson Mesa	LONEOS	·	3.7 km	MPC · JPL
104684	2000 GG_{154}	—	April 6, 2000	Anderson Mesa	LONEOS	·	2.8 km	MPC · JPL
104685	2000 GK_{154}	—	April 6, 2000	Anderson Mesa	LONEOS	·	3.1 km	MPC · JPL
104686	2000 GQ_{154}	—	April 6, 2000	Anderson Mesa	LONEOS	·	2.3 km	MPC · JPL
104687	2000 GK_{155}	—	April 6, 2000	Anderson Mesa	LONEOS	GEF	2.3 km	MPC · JPL
104688	2000 GN_{155}	—	April 6, 2000	Anderson Mesa	LONEOS	·	6.2 km	MPC · JPL
104689	2000 GO_{155}	—	April 6, 2000	Anderson Mesa	LONEOS	EOS	4.0 km	MPC · JPL
104690	2000 GX_{156}	—	April 6, 2000	Socorro	LINEAR	TEL	2.5 km	MPC · JPL
104691	2000 GV_{158}	—	April 7, 2000	Anderson Mesa	LONEOS	KOR	3.3 km	MPC · JPL
104692	2000 GX_{158}	—	April 7, 2000	Anderson Mesa	LONEOS	KOR	3.3 km	MPC · JPL
104693	2000 GB_{160}	—	April 7, 2000	Socorro	LINEAR	·	3.1 km	MPC · JPL
104694	2000 GL_{160}	—	April 7, 2000	Socorro	LINEAR	·	5.5 km	MPC · JPL
104695	2000 GU_{161}	—	April 7, 2000	Anderson Mesa	LONEOS	·	7.3 km	MPC · JPL
104696	2000 GV_{161}	—	April 7, 2000	Anderson Mesa	LONEOS	·	2.1 km	MPC · JPL
104697	2000 GW_{162}	—	April 8, 2000	Socorro	LINEAR	·	2.3 km	MPC · JPL
104698 Alvindrew	2000 GJ_{163}	Alvindrew	April 10, 2000	Kitt Peak	M. W. Buie	·	1.2 km	MPC · JPL
104699	2000 GC_{164}	—	April 12, 2000	Haleakala	NEAT	·	2.4 km	MPC · JPL
104700	2000 GK_{164}	—	April 5, 2000	Anderson Mesa	LONEOS	MAR	3.7 km	MPC · JPL

== 104701–104800 ==
back to top

Designation			Discovery			Properties		Ref
Permanent	Provisional	Named after	Date	Site	Discoverer(s)	Category	Diam.	Ref
104701	2000 GV_{164}	—	April 5, 2000	Socorro	LINEAR	·	4.2 km	MPC · JPL
104702	2000 GZ_{164}	—	April 5, 2000	Socorro	LINEAR	·	1.9 km	MPC · JPL
104703	2000 GK_{166}	—	April 5, 2000	Socorro	LINEAR	·	5.1 km	MPC · JPL
104704	2000 GM_{167}	—	April 4, 2000	Anderson Mesa	LONEOS	ADE	5.0 km	MPC · JPL
104705	2000 GS_{167}	—	April 4, 2000	Anderson Mesa	LONEOS	·	3.7 km	MPC · JPL
104706	2000 GZ_{167}	—	April 4, 2000	Anderson Mesa	LONEOS	NYS	2.3 km	MPC · JPL
104707	2000 GA_{168}	—	April 4, 2000	Anderson Mesa	LONEOS	·	1.8 km	MPC · JPL
104708	2000 GK_{168}	—	April 4, 2000	Anderson Mesa	LONEOS	·	4.0 km	MPC · JPL
104709	2000 GO_{168}	—	April 4, 2000	Anderson Mesa	LONEOS	PAD	3.9 km	MPC · JPL
104710	2000 GR_{168}	—	April 4, 2000	Anderson Mesa	LONEOS	EOS	4.6 km	MPC · JPL
104711	2000 GU_{168}	—	April 4, 2000	Socorro	LINEAR	V	1.4 km	MPC · JPL
104712	2000 GK_{171}	—	April 5, 2000	Anderson Mesa	LONEOS	·	6.2 km	MPC · JPL
104713	2000 GO_{171}	—	April 5, 2000	Anderson Mesa	LONEOS	EOS	3.8 km	MPC · JPL
104714	2000 GT_{171}	—	April 2, 2000	Socorro	LINEAR	·	8.1 km	MPC · JPL
104715	2000 GZ_{171}	—	April 3, 2000	Socorro	LINEAR	EOS	4.0 km	MPC · JPL
104716	2000 GM_{172}	—	April 2, 2000	Anderson Mesa	LONEOS	·	2.7 km	MPC · JPL
104717	2000 GH_{173}	—	April 5, 2000	Anderson Mesa	LONEOS	·	6.1 km	MPC · JPL
104718	2000 GQ_{174}	—	April 2, 2000	Anderson Mesa	LONEOS	·	4.4 km	MPC · JPL
104719	2000 GY_{174}	—	April 3, 2000	Kitt Peak	Spacewatch	·	4.2 km	MPC · JPL
104720	2000 GA_{175}	—	April 3, 2000	Kitt Peak	Spacewatch	·	2.4 km	MPC · JPL
104721	2000 GQ_{175}	—	April 2, 2000	Kitt Peak	Spacewatch	·	2.6 km	MPC · JPL
104722	2000 GU_{175}	—	April 2, 2000	Anderson Mesa	LONEOS	·	4.0 km	MPC · JPL
104723	2000 GY_{175}	—	April 2, 2000	Kitt Peak	Spacewatch	·	2.7 km	MPC · JPL
104724	2000 GK_{176}	—	April 2, 2000	Kitt Peak	Spacewatch	AST	4.9 km	MPC · JPL
104725	2000 GX_{176}	—	April 3, 2000	Kitt Peak	Spacewatch	KOR	3.3 km	MPC · JPL
104726	2000 GX_{178}	—	April 4, 2000	Anderson Mesa	LONEOS	·	3.0 km	MPC · JPL
104727	2000 GY_{178}	—	April 4, 2000	Socorro	LINEAR	·	2.0 km	MPC · JPL
104728	2000 GP_{179}	—	April 5, 2000	Anderson Mesa	LONEOS	·	6.0 km	MPC · JPL
104729	2000 GT_{181}	—	April 5, 2000	Anderson Mesa	LONEOS	·	5.1 km	MPC · JPL
104730	2000 HQ	—	April 24, 2000	Kitt Peak	Spacewatch	·	3.5 km	MPC · JPL
104731	2000 HB_{2}	—	April 25, 2000	Kitt Peak	Spacewatch	·	4.8 km	MPC · JPL
104732	2000 HH_{2}	—	April 25, 2000	Kitt Peak	Spacewatch	·	2.1 km	MPC · JPL
104733	2000 HT_{2}	—	April 25, 2000	Kitt Peak	Spacewatch	·	4.8 km	MPC · JPL
104734	2000 HU_{2}	—	April 25, 2000	Kitt Peak	Spacewatch	(5)	2.9 km	MPC · JPL
104735	2000 HZ_{2}	—	April 25, 2000	Kitt Peak	Spacewatch	·	3.1 km	MPC · JPL
104736	2000 HJ_{4}	—	April 27, 2000	Kitt Peak	Spacewatch	·	6.4 km	MPC · JPL
104737	2000 HG_{5}	—	April 28, 2000	Socorro	LINEAR	H	970 m	MPC · JPL
104738	2000 HX_{7}	—	April 27, 2000	Socorro	LINEAR	·	9.0 km	MPC · JPL
104739	2000 HU_{8}	—	April 27, 2000	Socorro	LINEAR	·	2.5 km	MPC · JPL
104740	2000 HY_{8}	—	April 27, 2000	Socorro	LINEAR	·	4.1 km	MPC · JPL
104741	2000 HC_{9}	—	April 27, 2000	Socorro	LINEAR	·	2.7 km	MPC · JPL
104742	2000 HY_{9}	—	April 27, 2000	Socorro	LINEAR	·	4.8 km	MPC · JPL
104743	2000 HW_{10}	—	April 27, 2000	Socorro	LINEAR	·	3.5 km	MPC · JPL
104744	2000 HX_{10}	—	April 27, 2000	Socorro	LINEAR	EUN	2.7 km	MPC · JPL
104745	2000 HN_{11}	—	April 28, 2000	Socorro	LINEAR	·	5.1 km	MPC · JPL
104746	2000 HZ_{11}	—	April 28, 2000	Socorro	LINEAR	·	2.9 km	MPC · JPL
104747	2000 HE_{12}	—	April 28, 2000	Socorro	LINEAR	NYS	2.0 km	MPC · JPL
104748	2000 HO_{12}	—	April 28, 2000	Socorro	LINEAR	·	4.2 km	MPC · JPL
104749	2000 HR_{12}	—	April 28, 2000	Socorro	LINEAR	NYS	2.8 km	MPC · JPL
104750	2000 HW_{12}	—	April 28, 2000	Socorro	LINEAR	·	3.1 km	MPC · JPL
104751	2000 HM_{13}	—	April 28, 2000	Socorro	LINEAR	·	4.5 km	MPC · JPL
104752	2000 HP_{13}	—	April 28, 2000	Socorro	LINEAR	HYG	4.3 km	MPC · JPL
104753	2000 HZ_{14}	—	April 27, 2000	Socorro	LINEAR	·	2.6 km	MPC · JPL
104754	2000 HC_{15}	—	April 27, 2000	Socorro	LINEAR	·	5.1 km	MPC · JPL
104755	2000 HF_{15}	—	April 27, 2000	Socorro	LINEAR	·	3.7 km	MPC · JPL
104756	2000 HW_{15}	—	April 29, 2000	Socorro	LINEAR	·	2.1 km	MPC · JPL
104757	2000 HF_{16}	—	April 29, 2000	Socorro	LINEAR	MAS	1.5 km	MPC · JPL
104758	2000 HR_{18}	—	April 25, 2000	Kitt Peak	Spacewatch	KOR	2.9 km	MPC · JPL
104759	2000 HY_{18}	—	April 25, 2000	Kitt Peak	Spacewatch	·	4.5 km	MPC · JPL
104760	2000 HD_{19}	—	April 25, 2000	Kitt Peak	Spacewatch	·	6.3 km	MPC · JPL
104761	2000 HF_{22}	—	April 29, 2000	Socorro	LINEAR	·	2.2 km	MPC · JPL
104762	2000 HO_{22}	—	April 29, 2000	Socorro	LINEAR	EOS	3.9 km	MPC · JPL
104763	2000 HT_{22}	—	April 29, 2000	Socorro	LINEAR	·	2.5 km	MPC · JPL
104764	2000 HG_{23}	—	April 30, 2000	Socorro	LINEAR	EOS	4.1 km	MPC · JPL
104765	2000 HN_{23}	—	April 30, 2000	Socorro	LINEAR	·	3.0 km	MPC · JPL
104766	2000 HG_{24}	—	April 29, 2000	Tebbutt	F. B. Zoltowski	·	4.1 km	MPC · JPL
104767	2000 HP_{25}	—	April 24, 2000	Anderson Mesa	LONEOS	MAR	1.9 km	MPC · JPL
104768	2000 HG_{26}	—	April 24, 2000	Anderson Mesa	LONEOS	·	4.0 km	MPC · JPL
104769	2000 HV_{26}	—	April 24, 2000	Anderson Mesa	LONEOS	KOR	2.9 km	MPC · JPL
104770	2000 HC_{28}	—	April 28, 2000	Socorro	LINEAR	H	1.4 km	MPC · JPL
104771	2000 HH_{28}	—	April 29, 2000	Socorro	LINEAR	·	6.5 km	MPC · JPL
104772	2000 HV_{28}	—	April 29, 2000	Socorro	LINEAR	PHO	3.3 km	MPC · JPL
104773	2000 HE_{29}	—	April 27, 2000	Socorro	LINEAR	·	2.5 km	MPC · JPL
104774	2000 HP_{29}	—	April 28, 2000	Socorro	LINEAR	·	4.0 km	MPC · JPL
104775	2000 HQ_{29}	—	April 28, 2000	Socorro	LINEAR	·	7.4 km	MPC · JPL
104776	2000 HW_{29}	—	April 28, 2000	Socorro	LINEAR	PHO	3.8 km	MPC · JPL
104777	2000 HP_{30}	—	April 28, 2000	Socorro	LINEAR	·	3.7 km	MPC · JPL
104778	2000 HX_{30}	—	April 28, 2000	Socorro	LINEAR	JUN	2.1 km	MPC · JPL
104779	2000 HR_{31}	—	April 29, 2000	Socorro	LINEAR	·	3.6 km	MPC · JPL
104780	2000 HX_{31}	—	April 29, 2000	Socorro	LINEAR	THM	5.0 km	MPC · JPL
104781	2000 HA_{32}	—	April 29, 2000	Socorro	LINEAR	NAE	6.6 km	MPC · JPL
104782	2000 HJ_{32}	—	April 29, 2000	Socorro	LINEAR	·	2.7 km	MPC · JPL
104783	2000 HT_{32}	—	April 29, 2000	Socorro	LINEAR	·	3.8 km	MPC · JPL
104784	2000 HX_{32}	—	April 29, 2000	Socorro	LINEAR	HNS · slow	3.1 km	MPC · JPL
104785	2000 HL_{33}	—	April 29, 2000	Socorro	LINEAR	AEG	6.7 km	MPC · JPL
104786	2000 HH_{35}	—	April 27, 2000	Socorro	LINEAR	·	7.1 km	MPC · JPL
104787	2000 HZ_{35}	—	April 28, 2000	Socorro	LINEAR	·	7.3 km	MPC · JPL
104788	2000 HD_{36}	—	April 28, 2000	Socorro	LINEAR	·	3.2 km	MPC · JPL
104789	2000 HL_{36}	—	April 28, 2000	Socorro	LINEAR	·	3.3 km	MPC · JPL
104790	2000 HP_{36}	—	April 28, 2000	Socorro	LINEAR	·	3.3 km	MPC · JPL
104791	2000 HG_{37}	—	April 28, 2000	Socorro	LINEAR	·	2.9 km	MPC · JPL
104792	2000 HJ_{37}	—	April 28, 2000	Socorro	LINEAR	·	6.3 km	MPC · JPL
104793	2000 HB_{38}	—	April 28, 2000	Kitt Peak	Spacewatch	V	1.7 km	MPC · JPL
104794	2000 HP_{38}	—	April 28, 2000	Kitt Peak	Spacewatch	·	5.9 km	MPC · JPL
104795	2000 HS_{39}	—	April 29, 2000	Kitt Peak	Spacewatch	·	6.5 km	MPC · JPL
104796	2000 HS_{40}	—	April 28, 2000	Socorro	LINEAR	(5)	3.0 km	MPC · JPL
104797	2000 HG_{41}	—	April 28, 2000	Socorro	LINEAR	·	3.6 km	MPC · JPL
104798	2000 HH_{41}	—	April 28, 2000	Socorro	LINEAR	·	6.1 km	MPC · JPL
104799	2000 HH_{42}	—	April 28, 2000	Anderson Mesa	LONEOS	·	2.7 km	MPC · JPL
104800	2000 HK_{42}	—	April 29, 2000	Socorro	LINEAR	·	3.1 km	MPC · JPL

== 104801–104900 ==
back to top

Designation			Discovery			Properties		Ref
Permanent	Provisional	Named after	Date	Site	Discoverer(s)	Category	Diam.	Ref
104801	2000 HL_{42}	—	April 29, 2000	Socorro	LINEAR	JUN	1.7 km	MPC · JPL
104802	2000 HZ_{42}	—	April 29, 2000	Socorro	LINEAR	·	2.6 km	MPC · JPL
104803	2000 HJ_{43}	—	April 29, 2000	Socorro	LINEAR	NYS	2.5 km	MPC · JPL
104804	2000 HN_{43}	—	April 29, 2000	Kitt Peak	Spacewatch	·	4.0 km	MPC · JPL
104805	2000 HS_{43}	—	April 29, 2000	Kitt Peak	Spacewatch	·	3.8 km	MPC · JPL
104806	2000 HU_{44}	—	April 26, 2000	Anderson Mesa	LONEOS	TIR	4.5 km	MPC · JPL
104807	2000 HS_{45}	—	April 26, 2000	Anderson Mesa	LONEOS	·	2.6 km	MPC · JPL
104808	2000 HG_{47}	—	April 29, 2000	Socorro	LINEAR	·	3.8 km	MPC · JPL
104809	2000 HL_{47}	—	April 29, 2000	Socorro	LINEAR	·	6.2 km	MPC · JPL
104810	2000 HQ_{47}	—	April 29, 2000	Socorro	LINEAR	THM	4.2 km	MPC · JPL
104811	2000 HP_{48}	—	April 29, 2000	Socorro	LINEAR	·	2.3 km	MPC · JPL
104812	2000 HV_{48}	—	April 29, 2000	Socorro	LINEAR	·	4.5 km	MPC · JPL
104813	2000 HO_{49}	—	April 29, 2000	Socorro	LINEAR	·	6.0 km	MPC · JPL
104814	2000 HH_{50}	—	April 29, 2000	Socorro	LINEAR	(5)	2.3 km	MPC · JPL
104815	2000 HK_{50}	—	April 29, 2000	Socorro	LINEAR	·	4.8 km	MPC · JPL
104816	2000 HC_{51}	—	April 29, 2000	Socorro	LINEAR	·	5.3 km	MPC · JPL
104817	2000 HW_{51}	—	April 29, 2000	Socorro	LINEAR	NYS	2.4 km	MPC · JPL
104818	2000 HE_{52}	—	April 29, 2000	Socorro	LINEAR	·	2.6 km	MPC · JPL
104819	2000 HK_{54}	—	April 29, 2000	Socorro	LINEAR	THM	4.2 km	MPC · JPL
104820	2000 HQ_{55}	—	April 24, 2000	Anderson Mesa	LONEOS	·	5.2 km	MPC · JPL
104821	2000 HR_{55}	—	April 24, 2000	Anderson Mesa	LONEOS	NYS	2.0 km	MPC · JPL
104822	2000 HS_{55}	—	April 24, 2000	Anderson Mesa	LONEOS	V	1.2 km	MPC · JPL
104823	2000 HK_{56}	—	April 24, 2000	Anderson Mesa	LONEOS	·	3.8 km	MPC · JPL
104824	2000 HP_{56}	—	April 24, 2000	Anderson Mesa	LONEOS	ANF	3.1 km	MPC · JPL
104825	2000 HJ_{58}	—	April 24, 2000	Kitt Peak	Spacewatch	·	4.0 km	MPC · JPL
104826	2000 HM_{58}	—	April 25, 2000	Kitt Peak	Spacewatch	·	1.7 km	MPC · JPL
104827	2000 HP_{59}	—	April 25, 2000	Anderson Mesa	LONEOS	EOS	4.8 km	MPC · JPL
104828	2000 HC_{60}	—	April 25, 2000	Anderson Mesa	LONEOS	·	5.2 km	MPC · JPL
104829	2000 HX_{62}	—	April 26, 2000	Anderson Mesa	LONEOS	·	7.1 km	MPC · JPL
104830	2000 HD_{63}	—	April 26, 2000	Anderson Mesa	LONEOS	·	1.8 km	MPC · JPL
104831	2000 HQ_{63}	—	April 26, 2000	Anderson Mesa	LONEOS	RAF	1.7 km	MPC · JPL
104832	2000 HN_{64}	—	April 26, 2000	Anderson Mesa	LONEOS	EUN	2.6 km	MPC · JPL
104833	2000 HH_{65}	—	April 26, 2000	Anderson Mesa	LONEOS	·	6.3 km	MPC · JPL
104834	2000 HO_{67}	—	April 27, 2000	Kitt Peak	Spacewatch	·	3.0 km	MPC · JPL
104835	2000 HQ_{68}	—	April 28, 2000	Kitt Peak	Spacewatch	·	2.2 km	MPC · JPL
104836	2000 HH_{70}	—	April 26, 2000	Anderson Mesa	LONEOS	·	7.3 km	MPC · JPL
104837	2000 HT_{70}	—	April 26, 2000	Anderson Mesa	LONEOS	·	6.0 km	MPC · JPL
104838	2000 HY_{70}	—	April 26, 2000	Anderson Mesa	LONEOS	·	2.4 km	MPC · JPL
104839	2000 HA_{71}	—	April 30, 2000	Anderson Mesa	LONEOS	·	7.3 km	MPC · JPL
104840	2000 HF_{71}	—	April 24, 2000	Anderson Mesa	LONEOS	·	4.8 km	MPC · JPL
104841	2000 HK_{71}	—	April 24, 2000	Anderson Mesa	LONEOS	·	3.9 km	MPC · JPL
104842	2000 HW_{71}	—	April 25, 2000	Anderson Mesa	LONEOS	·	3.5 km	MPC · JPL
104843	2000 HZ_{71}	—	April 25, 2000	Anderson Mesa	LONEOS	·	1.7 km	MPC · JPL
104844	2000 HE_{72}	—	April 25, 2000	Anderson Mesa	LONEOS	EUN	1.7 km	MPC · JPL
104845	2000 HZ_{72}	—	April 27, 2000	Anderson Mesa	LONEOS	·	2.4 km	MPC · JPL
104846	2000 HH_{73}	—	April 27, 2000	Anderson Mesa	LONEOS	·	2.6 km	MPC · JPL
104847	2000 HV_{73}	—	April 27, 2000	Anderson Mesa	LONEOS	·	3.1 km	MPC · JPL
104848	2000 HL_{74}	—	April 30, 2000	Haleakala	NEAT	·	3.7 km	MPC · JPL
104849	2000 HP_{74}	—	April 27, 2000	Kitt Peak	Spacewatch	·	2.3 km	MPC · JPL
104850	2000 HS_{74}	—	April 27, 2000	Socorro	LINEAR	·	2.1 km	MPC · JPL
104851	2000 HH_{75}	—	April 27, 2000	Socorro	LINEAR	VER	9.1 km	MPC · JPL
104852	2000 HJ_{75}	—	April 27, 2000	Socorro	LINEAR	·	2.6 km	MPC · JPL
104853	2000 HN_{75}	—	April 27, 2000	Socorro	LINEAR	·	5.7 km	MPC · JPL
104854	2000 HR_{75}	—	April 27, 2000	Socorro	LINEAR	·	3.5 km	MPC · JPL
104855	2000 HK_{76}	—	April 27, 2000	Socorro	LINEAR	·	5.4 km	MPC · JPL
104856	2000 HJ_{77}	—	April 28, 2000	Anderson Mesa	LONEOS	EUN	2.4 km	MPC · JPL
104857	2000 HT_{77}	—	April 28, 2000	Socorro	LINEAR	·	4.7 km	MPC · JPL
104858	2000 HA_{78}	—	April 28, 2000	Socorro	LINEAR	·	7.0 km	MPC · JPL
104859	2000 HU_{78}	—	April 28, 2000	Anderson Mesa	LONEOS	TIR · fast	5.8 km	MPC · JPL
104860	2000 HV_{78}	—	April 28, 2000	Anderson Mesa	LONEOS	EUN	2.0 km	MPC · JPL
104861	2000 HT_{79}	—	April 28, 2000	Anderson Mesa	LONEOS	·	3.6 km	MPC · JPL
104862	2000 HV_{79}	—	April 28, 2000	Anderson Mesa	LONEOS	BRA	2.6 km	MPC · JPL
104863	2000 HA_{82}	—	April 29, 2000	Socorro	LINEAR	·	1.2 km	MPC · JPL
104864	2000 HF_{82}	—	April 29, 2000	Socorro	LINEAR	·	2.5 km	MPC · JPL
104865	2000 HG_{86}	—	April 30, 2000	Anderson Mesa	LONEOS	·	2.2 km	MPC · JPL
104866	2000 HM_{86}	—	April 30, 2000	Anderson Mesa	LONEOS	·	9.5 km	MPC · JPL
104867	2000 HY_{86}	—	April 30, 2000	Kitt Peak	Spacewatch	·	4.1 km	MPC · JPL
104868	2000 HP_{87}	—	April 27, 2000	Socorro	LINEAR	·	4.0 km	MPC · JPL
104869	2000 HQ_{89}	—	April 29, 2000	Socorro	LINEAR	MAS	1.3 km	MPC · JPL
104870	2000 HV_{93}	—	April 29, 2000	Socorro	LINEAR	·	3.6 km	MPC · JPL
104871	2000 HZ_{96}	—	April 27, 2000	Anderson Mesa	LONEOS	·	2.8 km	MPC · JPL
104872	2000 HF_{97}	—	April 27, 2000	Socorro	LINEAR	·	6.3 km	MPC · JPL
104873	2000 HG_{97}	—	April 27, 2000	Socorro	LINEAR	V	1.4 km	MPC · JPL
104874	2000 HH_{97}	—	April 27, 2000	Socorro	LINEAR	·	3.7 km	MPC · JPL
104875	2000 HZ_{97}	—	April 26, 2000	Kitt Peak	Spacewatch	MAS	1.6 km	MPC · JPL
104876	2000 HH_{98}	—	April 27, 2000	Kitt Peak	Spacewatch	3:2	8.5 km	MPC · JPL
104877	2000 HW_{99}	—	April 27, 2000	Anderson Mesa	LONEOS	·	5.2 km	MPC · JPL
104878	2000 HL_{100}	—	April 24, 2000	Anderson Mesa	LONEOS	·	3.0 km	MPC · JPL
104879	2000 HS_{100}	—	April 25, 2000	Kitt Peak	Spacewatch	·	4.1 km	MPC · JPL
104880	2000 HK_{102}	—	April 26, 2000	Anderson Mesa	LONEOS	·	5.9 km	MPC · JPL
104881	2000 HJ_{103}	—	April 27, 2000	Anderson Mesa	LONEOS	·	2.5 km	MPC · JPL
104882	2000 HK_{103}	—	April 27, 2000	Anderson Mesa	LONEOS	·	9.4 km	MPC · JPL
104883	2000 HT_{103}	—	April 27, 2000	Anderson Mesa	LONEOS	·	2.6 km	MPC · JPL
104884	2000 HU_{103}	—	April 27, 2000	Anderson Mesa	LONEOS	·	2.1 km	MPC · JPL
104885	2000 HW_{103}	—	April 27, 2000	Anderson Mesa	LONEOS	MAR	2.3 km	MPC · JPL
104886	2000 JS	—	May 1, 2000	Socorro	LINEAR	NYS	1.5 km	MPC · JPL
104887	2000 JH_{1}	—	May 2, 2000	Socorro	LINEAR	H	1.3 km	MPC · JPL
104888	2000 JL_{1}	—	May 1, 2000	Socorro	LINEAR	·	5.4 km	MPC · JPL
104889	2000 JQ_{1}	—	May 1, 2000	Socorro	LINEAR	·	2.9 km	MPC · JPL
104890	2000 JT_{1}	—	May 1, 2000	Socorro	LINEAR	PHO	2.5 km	MPC · JPL
104891	2000 JA_{2}	—	May 2, 2000	Socorro	LINEAR	·	6.4 km	MPC · JPL
104892	2000 JB_{2}	—	May 2, 2000	Socorro	LINEAR	·	3.9 km	MPC · JPL
104893	2000 JO_{2}	—	May 3, 2000	Socorro	LINEAR	H	1.1 km	MPC · JPL
104894	2000 JL_{3}	—	May 3, 2000	Socorro	LINEAR	H	1.1 km	MPC · JPL
104895	2000 JU_{4}	—	May 2, 2000	Kitt Peak	Spacewatch	·	6.4 km	MPC · JPL
104896 Schwanden	2000 JL_{5}	Schwanden	May 2, 2000	Drebach	J. Kandler	·	3.5 km	MPC · JPL
104897	2000 JP_{5}	—	May 5, 2000	Farpoint	Farpoint	·	2.9 km	MPC · JPL
104898	2000 JX_{5}	—	May 2, 2000	Socorro	LINEAR	T_{j} (2.98)	6.8 km	MPC · JPL
104899	2000 JS_{6}	—	May 4, 2000	Socorro	LINEAR	ADE	3.4 km	MPC · JPL
104900	2000 JL_{7}	—	May 1, 2000	Kitt Peak	Spacewatch	THM	5.8 km	MPC · JPL

== 104901–105000 ==
back to top

Designation			Discovery			Properties		Ref
Permanent	Provisional	Named after	Date	Site	Discoverer(s)	Category	Diam.	Ref
104901	2000 JM_{7}	—	May 1, 2000	Kitt Peak	Spacewatch	THM	5.1 km	MPC · JPL
104902	2000 JN_{8}	—	May 6, 2000	Socorro	LINEAR	H	1.3 km	MPC · JPL
104903	2000 JJ_{9}	—	May 3, 2000	Socorro	LINEAR	TIR	4.2 km	MPC · JPL
104904	2000 JP_{9}	—	May 3, 2000	Socorro	LINEAR	·	2.4 km	MPC · JPL
104905	2000 JW_{9}	—	May 4, 2000	Socorro	LINEAR	·	5.1 km	MPC · JPL
104906	2000 JK_{10}	—	May 7, 2000	Socorro	LINEAR	PHO	6.4 km	MPC · JPL
104907	2000 JX_{10}	—	May 3, 2000	Socorro	LINEAR	·	3.7 km	MPC · JPL
104908	2000 JZ_{10}	—	May 3, 2000	Socorro	LINEAR	·	5.8 km	MPC · JPL
104909	2000 JV_{12}	—	May 6, 2000	Socorro	LINEAR	·	5.0 km	MPC · JPL
104910	2000 JL_{13}	—	May 9, 2000	Socorro	LINEAR	EUN	2.4 km	MPC · JPL
104911	2000 JX_{13}	—	May 6, 2000	Socorro	LINEAR	·	4.6 km	MPC · JPL
104912	2000 JB_{15}	—	May 9, 2000	Socorro	LINEAR	·	6.3 km	MPC · JPL
104913	2000 JK_{15}	—	May 9, 2000	Prescott	P. G. Comba	·	3.2 km	MPC · JPL
104914	2000 JJ_{16}	—	May 5, 2000	Socorro	LINEAR	·	6.0 km	MPC · JPL
104915	2000 JR_{16}	—	May 6, 2000	Socorro	LINEAR	·	7.4 km	MPC · JPL
104916	2000 JM_{17}	—	May 5, 2000	Socorro	LINEAR	·	3.7 km	MPC · JPL
104917	2000 JR_{17}	—	May 6, 2000	Socorro	LINEAR	·	2.9 km	MPC · JPL
104918	2000 JX_{17}	—	May 6, 2000	Socorro	LINEAR	·	2.7 km	MPC · JPL
104919	2000 JA_{18}	—	May 6, 2000	Socorro	LINEAR	·	3.1 km	MPC · JPL
104920	2000 JU_{18}	—	May 3, 2000	Socorro	LINEAR	·	3.5 km	MPC · JPL
104921	2000 JW_{18}	—	May 3, 2000	Socorro	LINEAR	·	8.8 km	MPC · JPL
104922	2000 JA_{19}	—	May 3, 2000	Socorro	LINEAR	PHO	3.0 km	MPC · JPL
104923	2000 JN_{20}	—	May 6, 2000	Socorro	LINEAR	·	2.2 km	MPC · JPL
104924	2000 JL_{21}	—	May 6, 2000	Socorro	LINEAR	·	4.8 km	MPC · JPL
104925	2000 JJ_{22}	—	May 6, 2000	Socorro	LINEAR	·	2.0 km	MPC · JPL
104926	2000 JS_{23}	—	May 7, 2000	Socorro	LINEAR	EUN	2.5 km	MPC · JPL
104927	2000 JU_{23}	—	May 7, 2000	Socorro	LINEAR	·	2.7 km	MPC · JPL
104928	2000 JS_{25}	—	May 7, 2000	Socorro	LINEAR	EOS	3.1 km	MPC · JPL
104929	2000 JX_{25}	—	May 7, 2000	Socorro	LINEAR	·	3.6 km	MPC · JPL
104930	2000 JO_{28}	—	May 7, 2000	Socorro	LINEAR	·	2.8 km	MPC · JPL
104931	2000 JC_{29}	—	May 7, 2000	Socorro	LINEAR	·	2.2 km	MPC · JPL
104932	2000 JH_{29}	—	May 7, 2000	Socorro	LINEAR	CLO	4.1 km	MPC · JPL
104933	2000 JJ_{29}	—	May 7, 2000	Socorro	LINEAR	·	2.3 km	MPC · JPL
104934	2000 JN_{29}	—	May 7, 2000	Socorro	LINEAR	NYS	2.7 km	MPC · JPL
104935	2000 JN_{30}	—	May 7, 2000	Socorro	LINEAR	·	1.1 km	MPC · JPL
104936	2000 JN_{31}	—	May 7, 2000	Socorro	LINEAR	·	3.7 km	MPC · JPL
104937	2000 JY_{31}	—	May 7, 2000	Socorro	LINEAR	EUN	2.5 km	MPC · JPL
104938	2000 JT_{32}	—	May 7, 2000	Socorro	LINEAR	·	2.9 km	MPC · JPL
104939	2000 JK_{33}	—	May 7, 2000	Socorro	LINEAR	·	5.1 km	MPC · JPL
104940	2000 JC_{35}	—	May 7, 2000	Socorro	LINEAR	·	2.3 km	MPC · JPL
104941	2000 JK_{35}	—	May 7, 2000	Socorro	LINEAR	·	2.3 km	MPC · JPL
104942	2000 JZ_{35}	—	May 7, 2000	Socorro	LINEAR	·	9.2 km	MPC · JPL
104943	2000 JQ_{40}	—	May 5, 2000	Socorro	LINEAR	HIL · 3:2 · (6124)	14 km	MPC · JPL
104944	2000 JN_{41}	—	May 7, 2000	Socorro	LINEAR	TEL	2.8 km	MPC · JPL
104945	2000 JN_{42}	—	May 7, 2000	Socorro	LINEAR	·	6.5 km	MPC · JPL
104946	2000 JU_{42}	—	May 7, 2000	Socorro	LINEAR	·	1.4 km	MPC · JPL
104947	2000 JB_{43}	—	May 7, 2000	Socorro	LINEAR	·	2.8 km	MPC · JPL
104948	2000 JN_{43}	—	May 7, 2000	Socorro	LINEAR	·	3.2 km	MPC · JPL
104949	2000 JR_{44}	—	May 7, 2000	Socorro	LINEAR	·	4.1 km	MPC · JPL
104950	2000 JX_{44}	—	May 7, 2000	Socorro	LINEAR	·	5.6 km	MPC · JPL
104951	2000 JY_{44}	—	May 7, 2000	Socorro	LINEAR	THM	3.4 km	MPC · JPL
104952	2000 JV_{45}	—	May 7, 2000	Socorro	LINEAR	THM	6.9 km	MPC · JPL
104953	2000 JX_{45}	—	May 7, 2000	Socorro	LINEAR	·	5.1 km	MPC · JPL
104954	2000 JJ_{47}	—	May 9, 2000	Socorro	LINEAR	·	9.6 km	MPC · JPL
104955	2000 JH_{49}	—	May 9, 2000	Socorro	LINEAR	ADE	4.4 km	MPC · JPL
104956	2000 JK_{49}	—	May 9, 2000	Socorro	LINEAR	·	7.6 km	MPC · JPL
104957	2000 JR_{49}	—	May 9, 2000	Socorro	LINEAR	·	8.3 km	MPC · JPL
104958	2000 JS_{49}	—	May 9, 2000	Socorro	LINEAR	·	4.7 km	MPC · JPL
104959	2000 JN_{50}	—	May 9, 2000	Socorro	LINEAR	·	7.6 km	MPC · JPL
104960	2000 JY_{51}	—	May 9, 2000	Socorro	LINEAR	·	6.2 km	MPC · JPL
104961	2000 JX_{52}	—	May 9, 2000	Socorro	LINEAR	(5)	2.4 km	MPC · JPL
104962	2000 JY_{52}	—	May 9, 2000	Socorro	LINEAR	·	3.6 km	MPC · JPL
104963	2000 JE_{54}	—	May 6, 2000	Socorro	LINEAR	·	3.9 km	MPC · JPL
104964	2000 JP_{54}	—	May 6, 2000	Socorro	LINEAR	·	4.9 km	MPC · JPL
104965	2000 JH_{56}	—	May 6, 2000	Socorro	LINEAR	·	2.6 km	MPC · JPL
104966	2000 JU_{57}	—	May 6, 2000	Socorro	LINEAR	EUN	3.5 km	MPC · JPL
104967	2000 JW_{57}	—	May 6, 2000	Socorro	LINEAR	TIR	4.0 km	MPC · JPL
104968	2000 JX_{58}	—	May 6, 2000	Socorro	LINEAR	DOR · fast	4.8 km	MPC · JPL
104969	2000 JF_{59}	—	May 7, 2000	Socorro	LINEAR	·	7.3 km	MPC · JPL
104970	2000 JQ_{59}	—	May 7, 2000	Socorro	LINEAR	·	6.2 km	MPC · JPL
104971	2000 JJ_{60}	—	May 7, 2000	Socorro	LINEAR	·	5.6 km	MPC · JPL
104972	2000 JX_{63}	—	May 10, 2000	Socorro	LINEAR	·	2.9 km	MPC · JPL
104973	2000 JM_{64}	—	May 4, 2000	Anderson Mesa	LONEOS	·	7.1 km	MPC · JPL
104974	2000 JX_{64}	—	May 4, 2000	Anderson Mesa	LONEOS	·	2.8 km	MPC · JPL
104975	2000 JB_{65}	—	May 5, 2000	Socorro	LINEAR	·	7.5 km	MPC · JPL
104976	2000 JH_{65}	—	May 5, 2000	Socorro	LINEAR	·	8.0 km	MPC · JPL
104977	2000 JK_{65}	—	May 5, 2000	Socorro	LINEAR	·	7.0 km	MPC · JPL
104978	2000 JZ_{65}	—	May 6, 2000	Socorro	LINEAR	EUP	8.2 km	MPC · JPL
104979	2000 JN_{69}	—	May 1, 2000	Anderson Mesa	LONEOS	·	8.8 km	MPC · JPL
104980	2000 JP_{71}	—	May 1, 2000	Anderson Mesa	LONEOS	·	1.9 km	MPC · JPL
104981	2000 JS_{71}	—	May 1, 2000	Anderson Mesa	LONEOS	·	7.1 km	MPC · JPL
104982	2000 JS_{73}	—	May 2, 2000	Anderson Mesa	LONEOS	·	4.6 km	MPC · JPL
104983	2000 JY_{73}	—	May 2, 2000	Kitt Peak	Spacewatch	·	4.6 km	MPC · JPL
104984	2000 JL_{77}	—	May 7, 2000	Socorro	LINEAR	·	2.5 km	MPC · JPL
104985	2000 JB_{79}	—	May 4, 2000	Kitt Peak	Spacewatch	·	4.3 km	MPC · JPL
104986	2000 JQ_{82}	—	May 7, 2000	Socorro	LINEAR	·	6.7 km	MPC · JPL
104987	2000 JK_{83}	—	May 7, 2000	Socorro	LINEAR	·	2.5 km	MPC · JPL
104988	2000 JB_{84}	—	May 5, 2000	Socorro	LINEAR	H	940 m	MPC · JPL
104989	2000 JH_{84}	—	May 5, 2000	Socorro	LINEAR	·	4.8 km	MPC · JPL
104990	2000 JR_{84}	—	May 13, 2000	Kitt Peak	Spacewatch	·	2.6 km	MPC · JPL
104991	2000 JT_{84}	—	May 12, 2000	Haleakala	NEAT	·	4.2 km	MPC · JPL
104992	2000 JF_{85}	—	May 5, 2000	Socorro	LINEAR	·	2.5 km	MPC · JPL
104993	2000 JQ_{85}	—	May 2, 2000	Kitt Peak	Spacewatch	·	2.2 km	MPC · JPL
104994	2000 JY_{85}	—	May 2, 2000	Anderson Mesa	LONEOS	TIR	7.2 km	MPC · JPL
104995	2000 KJ	—	May 23, 2000	Prescott	P. G. Comba	MAS	1.6 km	MPC · JPL
104996	2000 KH_{2}	—	May 26, 2000	Socorro	LINEAR	T_{j} (2.96)	8.7 km	MPC · JPL
104997	2000 KS_{2}	—	May 26, 2000	Socorro	LINEAR	·	10 km	MPC · JPL
104998	2000 KT_{2}	—	May 26, 2000	Socorro	LINEAR	·	6.3 km	MPC · JPL
104999	2000 KW_{2}	—	May 26, 2000	Socorro	LINEAR	·	6.1 km	MPC · JPL
105000	2000 KZ_{3}	—	May 27, 2000	Prescott	P. G. Comba	·	6.4 km	MPC · JPL

back to top

== See also ==
- Meanings of minor-planet names: 104001–105000
