= Meanings of minor-planet names: 104001–105000 =

As minor planet discoveries are confirmed, they are given a permanent number by the IAU's Minor Planet Center (MPC), and the discoverers can then submit names for them, following the IAU's naming conventions. The list below concerns those minor planets in the specified number-range that have received names, and explains the meanings of those names.

Official naming citations of newly named small Solar System bodies are approved and published in a bulletin by IAU's Working Group for Small Bodies Nomenclature (WGSBN). Before May 2021, citations were published in MPC's Minor Planet Circulars for many decades. Recent citations can also be found on the JPL Small-Body Database (SBDB). Until his death in 2016, German astronomer Lutz D. Schmadel compiled these citations into the Dictionary of Minor Planet Names (DMP) and regularly updated the collection.

Based on Paul Herget's The Names of the Minor Planets, Schmadel also researched the unclear origin of numerous asteroids, most of which had been named prior to World War II. This article incorporates text from this source, which is in the public domain: SBDB New namings may only be added to this list below after official publication as the preannouncement of names is condemned. The WGSBN publishes a comprehensive guideline for the naming rules of non-cometary small Solar System bodies.

== 104001–104100 ==
Named minor planet	Provisional	This minor planet was named for...	Ref · Catalog
104020 Heilbronn	2000 DL_{110}	Heilbronn, a German city located on the Neckar river in the southern state of Baden-Württemberg. It was the home of physician, chemist and physicist Julius von Mayer (1814–1878), and houses Experimenta Heilbronn, the largest science centre in Germany.	JPL · 104020
104052 Zachery	2000 EE_{15}	Zachery Philip Brady (born 1990), son of New Zealand astronomer Nigel Brady who discovered this minor planet	JPL · 104052

== 104101–104200 ==
back to top

Named minor planet	Provisional	This minor planet was named for...	Ref · Catalog
There are no named minor planets in this number range

== 104201–104300 ==
back to top

Named minor planet	Provisional	This minor planet was named for...	Ref · Catalog
104210 Leeupton	2000 ES_{116}	Lee Upton (born 1943), assistant director of the Massachusetts Institute of Technology's Lincoln Laboratory from 2000 to 2009	JPL · 104210

== 104301–104400 ==
back to top

Named minor planet	Provisional	This minor planet was named for...	Ref · Catalog
There are no named minor planets in this number range

== 104401–104500 ==
back to top

Named minor planet	Provisional	This minor planet was named for...	Ref · Catalog
There are no named minor planets in this number range

== 104501–104600 ==
back to top

Named minor planet	Provisional	This minor planet was named for...	Ref · Catalog
There are no named minor planets in this number range

== 104601–104700 ==
back to top

Named minor planet	Provisional	This minor planet was named for...	Ref · Catalog
104698 Alvindrew	2000 GJ_{163}	Benjamin Alvin Drew (born 1962) is a former NASA astronaut who flew two Space Shuttle missions to the International Space Station as a mission specialist. He logged more than 25 days in space. He also conducted two space walks.	JPL · 104698

== 104701–104800 ==
back to top

Named minor planet	Provisional	This minor planet was named for...	Ref · Catalog
There are no named minor planets in this number range

== 104801–104900 ==
back to top

Named minor planet	Provisional	This minor planet was named for...	Ref · Catalog
104896 Schwanden	2000 JL_{5}	The Swiss village of Schwanden is part of Sigriswil in the canton of Bern, where the Sternwarte - Planetarium SIRIUS – a public observatory and planetarium, was founded by Swiss teacher Theo Gyger (born 1939) in 2000.	JPL · 104896

== 104901–105000 ==
back to top

Named minor planet	Provisional	This minor planet was named for...	Ref · Catalog
There are no named minor planets in this number range

back to top

Preceded by 103,001–104,000	Meanings of minor-planet names List of minor planets: 104,001–105,000	Succeeded by 105,001–106,000
