= List of minor planets: 105001–106000 =

The following is a partial list of minor planets, running from minor-planet number 105001 through 106000, inclusive. The primary data for this and other partial lists is based on JPL's "Small-Body Orbital Elements" and data available from the Minor Planet Center. Critical list information is also provided by the MPC, unless otherwise specified from Lowell Observatory. A detailed description of the table's columns and additional sources are given on the main page including a complete list of every page in this series, and a statistical break-up on the dynamical classification of minor planets.

Also see the summary list of all named bodies in numerical and alphabetical order, and the corresponding naming citations for the number range of this particular list. New namings may only be added to this list after official publication, as the preannouncement of names is condemned by the Working Group for Small Bodies Nomenclature of the International Astronomical Union.

Near-Earth obj.	MBA (inner)	MBA (outer)	Centaur
Mars-crosser	MBA (middle)	Jupiter trojan	Trans-Neptunian obj.
Unclassified

== 105001–105100 ==
Designation			Discovery			Properties		Ref
Permanent	Provisional	Named after	Date	Site	Discoverer(s)	Category	Diam.	Ref
105001	2000 KH_{5}	—	May 28, 2000	Socorro	LINEAR	H	1.1 km	MPC · JPL
105002	2000 KN_{5}	—	May 28, 2000	Socorro	LINEAR	·	5.4 km	MPC · JPL
105003	2000 KX_{5}	—	May 27, 2000	Socorro	LINEAR	·	3.7 km	MPC · JPL
105004	2000 KZ_{5}	—	May 27, 2000	Socorro	LINEAR	·	4.6 km	MPC · JPL
105005	2000 KR_{6}	—	May 27, 2000	Socorro	LINEAR	·	8.9 km	MPC · JPL
105006	2000 KP_{10}	—	May 28, 2000	Socorro	LINEAR	·	4.1 km	MPC · JPL
105007	2000 KR_{10}	—	May 28, 2000	Socorro	LINEAR	·	6.4 km	MPC · JPL
105008	2000 KZ_{10}	—	May 28, 2000	Socorro	LINEAR	·	3.5 km	MPC · JPL
105009	2000 KA_{12}	—	May 28, 2000	Socorro	LINEAR	·	1.6 km	MPC · JPL
105010	2000 KN_{12}	—	May 28, 2000	Socorro	LINEAR	·	3.6 km	MPC · JPL
105011	2000 KW_{12}	—	May 28, 2000	Socorro	LINEAR	·	1.5 km	MPC · JPL
105012	2000 KG_{13}	—	May 28, 2000	Socorro	LINEAR	·	5.1 km	MPC · JPL
105013	2000 KH_{13}	—	May 28, 2000	Socorro	LINEAR	·	2.5 km	MPC · JPL
105014	2000 KK_{13}	—	May 28, 2000	Socorro	LINEAR	·	3.2 km	MPC · JPL
105015	2000 KL_{13}	—	May 28, 2000	Socorro	LINEAR	KOR	2.6 km	MPC · JPL
105016	2000 KM_{13}	—	May 28, 2000	Socorro	LINEAR	EOS	3.4 km	MPC · JPL
105017	2000 KT_{13}	—	May 28, 2000	Socorro	LINEAR	EOS	3.4 km	MPC · JPL
105018	2000 KU_{15}	—	May 28, 2000	Socorro	LINEAR	·	3.9 km	MPC · JPL
105019	2000 KK_{16}	—	May 28, 2000	Socorro	LINEAR	EUN	2.5 km	MPC · JPL
105020	2000 KD_{17}	—	May 28, 2000	Socorro	LINEAR	·	2.9 km	MPC · JPL
105021	2000 KR_{21}	—	May 28, 2000	Socorro	LINEAR	·	5.4 km	MPC · JPL
105022	2000 KQ_{29}	—	May 28, 2000	Socorro	LINEAR	·	8.1 km	MPC · JPL
105023	2000 KD_{30}	—	May 28, 2000	Socorro	LINEAR	THM	6.4 km	MPC · JPL
105024	2000 KH_{30}	—	May 28, 2000	Socorro	LINEAR	·	4.0 km	MPC · JPL
105025	2000 KS_{30}	—	May 28, 2000	Socorro	LINEAR	·	5.2 km	MPC · JPL
105026	2000 KX_{30}	—	May 28, 2000	Socorro	LINEAR	·	7.3 km	MPC · JPL
105027	2000 KT_{31}	—	May 28, 2000	Socorro	LINEAR	·	3.3 km	MPC · JPL
105028	2000 KM_{32}	—	May 28, 2000	Socorro	LINEAR	·	3.2 km	MPC · JPL
105029	2000 KG_{33}	—	May 28, 2000	Socorro	LINEAR	·	4.2 km	MPC · JPL
105030	2000 KB_{35}	—	May 27, 2000	Socorro	LINEAR	·	2.5 km	MPC · JPL
105031	2000 KE_{35}	—	May 27, 2000	Socorro	LINEAR	TIR	3.9 km	MPC · JPL
105032	2000 KJ_{36}	—	May 27, 2000	Socorro	LINEAR	·	4.4 km	MPC · JPL
105033	2000 KU_{36}	—	May 28, 2000	Socorro	LINEAR	·	3.2 km	MPC · JPL
105034	2000 KF_{37}	—	May 24, 2000	Kitt Peak	Spacewatch	·	7.0 km	MPC · JPL
105035	2000 KD_{38}	—	May 24, 2000	Kitt Peak	Spacewatch	·	1.4 km	MPC · JPL
105036	2000 KM_{39}	—	May 24, 2000	Kitt Peak	Spacewatch	·	4.3 km	MPC · JPL
105037	2000 KS_{39}	—	May 24, 2000	Kitt Peak	Spacewatch	·	2.7 km	MPC · JPL
105038	2000 KG_{40}	—	May 26, 2000	Kitt Peak	Spacewatch	·	2.5 km	MPC · JPL
105039	2000 KN_{40}	—	May 30, 2000	Kitt Peak	Spacewatch	EOS	5.2 km	MPC · JPL
105040	2000 KA_{41}	—	May 27, 2000	Socorro	LINEAR	·	2.8 km	MPC · JPL
105041	2000 KO_{41}	—	May 27, 2000	Socorro	LINEAR	·	6.5 km	MPC · JPL
105042	2000 KB_{42}	—	May 27, 2000	Socorro	LINEAR	EOS	4.0 km	MPC · JPL
105043	2000 KH_{42}	—	May 28, 2000	Socorro	LINEAR	·	6.3 km	MPC · JPL
105044	2000 KM_{42}	—	May 28, 2000	Socorro	LINEAR	(194)	4.8 km	MPC · JPL
105045	2000 KH_{48}	—	May 27, 2000	Socorro	LINEAR	·	2.7 km	MPC · JPL
105046	2000 KP_{48}	—	May 27, 2000	Socorro	LINEAR	·	2.8 km	MPC · JPL
105047	2000 KG_{52}	—	May 23, 2000	Anderson Mesa	LONEOS	THM	5.2 km	MPC · JPL
105048	2000 KN_{52}	—	May 24, 2000	Anderson Mesa	LONEOS	·	5.8 km	MPC · JPL
105049	2000 KB_{53}	—	May 31, 2000	Kitt Peak	Spacewatch	ADE	6.2 km	MPC · JPL
105050	2000 KV_{53}	—	May 27, 2000	Anderson Mesa	LONEOS	·	3.6 km	MPC · JPL
105051	2000 KW_{53}	—	May 27, 2000	Anderson Mesa	LONEOS	·	2.3 km	MPC · JPL
105052	2000 KD_{54}	—	May 27, 2000	Anderson Mesa	LONEOS	EUN	2.8 km	MPC · JPL
105053	2000 KF_{54}	—	May 27, 2000	Anderson Mesa	LONEOS	·	2.5 km	MPC · JPL
105054	2000 KV_{55}	—	May 27, 2000	Socorro	LINEAR	·	3.3 km	MPC · JPL
105055	2000 KR_{57}	—	May 24, 2000	Anderson Mesa	LONEOS	·	3.8 km	MPC · JPL
105056	2000 KR_{58}	—	May 24, 2000	Anderson Mesa	LONEOS	·	5.6 km	MPC · JPL
105057	2000 KX_{60}	—	May 25, 2000	Anderson Mesa	LONEOS	·	6.6 km	MPC · JPL
105058	2000 KH_{61}	—	May 25, 2000	Anderson Mesa	LONEOS	TIR	5.4 km	MPC · JPL
105059	2000 KN_{61}	—	May 25, 2000	Anderson Mesa	LONEOS	·	2.6 km	MPC · JPL
105060	2000 KT_{61}	—	May 25, 2000	Anderson Mesa	LONEOS	·	4.5 km	MPC · JPL
105061	2000 KB_{62}	—	May 26, 2000	Anderson Mesa	LONEOS	·	5.7 km	MPC · JPL
105062	2000 KE_{62}	—	May 26, 2000	Anderson Mesa	LONEOS	EUN · slow	2.7 km	MPC · JPL
105063	2000 KZ_{62}	—	May 26, 2000	Anderson Mesa	LONEOS	·	6.2 km	MPC · JPL
105064	2000 KH_{63}	—	May 26, 2000	Anderson Mesa	LONEOS	·	6.4 km	MPC · JPL
105065	2000 KO_{63}	—	May 26, 2000	Anderson Mesa	LONEOS	MAR	2.7 km	MPC · JPL
105066	2000 KW_{63}	—	May 26, 2000	Anderson Mesa	LONEOS	·	6.9 km	MPC · JPL
105067	2000 KA_{66}	—	May 27, 2000	Anderson Mesa	LONEOS	·	3.3 km	MPC · JPL
105068	2000 KD_{66}	—	May 27, 2000	Anderson Mesa	LONEOS	·	7.0 km	MPC · JPL
105069	2000 KQ_{66}	—	May 28, 2000	Anderson Mesa	LONEOS	·	3.1 km	MPC · JPL
105070	2000 KV_{66}	—	May 23, 2000	Anderson Mesa	LONEOS	·	6.7 km	MPC · JPL
105071	2000 KX_{66}	—	May 30, 2000	Anderson Mesa	LONEOS	·	5.8 km	MPC · JPL
105072	2000 KY_{66}	—	May 31, 2000	Anderson Mesa	LONEOS	·	6.3 km	MPC · JPL
105073	2000 KY_{67}	—	May 30, 2000	Kitt Peak	Spacewatch	THM	3.9 km	MPC · JPL
105074	2000 KB_{68}	—	May 30, 2000	Socorro	LINEAR	·	6.6 km	MPC · JPL
105075	2000 KS_{69}	—	May 29, 2000	Kitt Peak	Spacewatch	·	4.2 km	MPC · JPL
105076	2000 KF_{70}	—	May 28, 2000	Socorro	LINEAR	LIX	8.0 km	MPC · JPL
105077	2000 KT_{70}	—	May 28, 2000	Kitt Peak	Spacewatch	·	5.9 km	MPC · JPL
105078	2000 KD_{71}	—	May 28, 2000	Socorro	LINEAR	·	2.3 km	MPC · JPL
105079	2000 KV_{73}	—	May 27, 2000	Socorro	LINEAR	·	5.9 km	MPC · JPL
105080	2000 KB_{74}	—	May 27, 2000	Socorro	LINEAR	V	2.0 km	MPC · JPL
105081	2000 KF_{74}	—	May 27, 2000	Socorro	LINEAR	slow	6.9 km	MPC · JPL
105082	2000 KC_{75}	—	May 27, 2000	Socorro	LINEAR	(8737)	5.4 km	MPC · JPL
105083	2000 KF_{75}	—	May 27, 2000	Socorro	LINEAR	·	3.0 km	MPC · JPL
105084	2000 KC_{76}	—	May 27, 2000	Anderson Mesa	LONEOS	526	4.4 km	MPC · JPL
105085	2000 KH_{78}	—	May 27, 2000	Socorro	LINEAR	EMA	6.7 km	MPC · JPL
105086	2000 KR_{78}	—	May 27, 2000	Socorro	LINEAR	·	2.9 km	MPC · JPL
105087	2000 KB_{79}	—	May 27, 2000	Socorro	LINEAR	·	6.0 km	MPC · JPL
105088	2000 KO_{81}	—	May 25, 2000	Anderson Mesa	LONEOS	·	2.5 km	MPC · JPL
105089	2000 KY_{81}	—	May 24, 2000	Anderson Mesa	LONEOS	·	7.9 km	MPC · JPL
105090	2000 KW_{82}	—	May 26, 2000	Anderson Mesa	LONEOS	·	4.1 km	MPC · JPL
105091	2000 LO	—	June 2, 2000	Reedy Creek	J. Broughton	·	6.0 km	MPC · JPL
105092	2000 LC_{1}	—	June 1, 2000	Črni Vrh	Matičič, S.	·	5.8 km	MPC · JPL
105093	2000 LE_{1}	—	June 1, 2000	Črni Vrh	Matičič, S.	·	5.7 km	MPC · JPL
105094	2000 LK_{1}	—	June 1, 2000	Bergisch Gladbach	W. Bickel	EOS	4.9 km	MPC · JPL
105095	2000 LQ_{1}	—	June 1, 2000	Bergisch Gladbach	W. Bickel	DOR	4.5 km	MPC · JPL
105096	2000 LY_{2}	—	June 4, 2000	Socorro	LINEAR	·	7.9 km	MPC · JPL
105097	2000 LL_{3}	—	June 4, 2000	Socorro	LINEAR	RAF	1.9 km	MPC · JPL
105098	2000 LA_{6}	—	June 4, 2000	Kitt Peak	Spacewatch	·	2.6 km	MPC · JPL
105099	2000 LC_{7}	—	June 5, 2000	Kitt Peak	Spacewatch	·	6.0 km	MPC · JPL
105100	2000 LD_{9}	—	June 5, 2000	Socorro	LINEAR	ADE	5.6 km	MPC · JPL

== 105101–105200 ==
back to top

Designation			Discovery			Properties		Ref
Permanent	Provisional	Named after	Date	Site	Discoverer(s)	Category	Diam.	Ref
105101	2000 LL_{9}	—	June 5, 2000	Socorro	LINEAR	TIR	7.0 km	MPC · JPL
105102	2000 LA_{11}	—	June 4, 2000	Socorro	LINEAR	·	3.6 km	MPC · JPL
105103	2000 LD_{11}	—	June 4, 2000	Socorro	LINEAR	·	3.1 km	MPC · JPL
105104	2000 LJ_{11}	—	June 4, 2000	Socorro	LINEAR	·	2.9 km	MPC · JPL
105105	2000 LH_{14}	—	June 6, 2000	Socorro	LINEAR	·	9.3 km	MPC · JPL
105106	2000 LS_{14}	—	June 7, 2000	Socorro	LINEAR	·	2.5 km	MPC · JPL
105107	2000 LY_{14}	—	June 2, 2000	Siding Spring	R. H. McNaught	T_{j} (2.99) · EUP	9.6 km	MPC · JPL
105108	2000 LS_{15}	—	June 7, 2000	Kitt Peak	Spacewatch	·	4.2 km	MPC · JPL
105109	2000 LX_{15}	—	June 1, 2000	Anderson Mesa	LONEOS	H	1.1 km	MPC · JPL
105110	2000 LT_{16}	—	June 4, 2000	Socorro	LINEAR	·	3.0 km	MPC · JPL
105111	2000 LP_{19}	—	June 8, 2000	Socorro	LINEAR	GEF	2.6 km	MPC · JPL
105112	2000 LS_{19}	—	June 8, 2000	Socorro	LINEAR	·	4.4 km	MPC · JPL
105113	2000 LX_{20}	—	June 8, 2000	Socorro	LINEAR	·	8.4 km	MPC · JPL
105114	2000 LS_{21}	—	June 8, 2000	Socorro	LINEAR	·	11 km	MPC · JPL
105115	2000 LA_{22}	—	June 8, 2000	Socorro	LINEAR	AEG	5.1 km	MPC · JPL
105116	2000 LN_{22}	—	June 6, 2000	Kitt Peak	Spacewatch	·	5.0 km	MPC · JPL
105117	2000 LA_{24}	—	June 1, 2000	Socorro	LINEAR	·	7.1 km	MPC · JPL
105118	2000 LH_{24}	—	June 1, 2000	Socorro	LINEAR	·	4.7 km	MPC · JPL
105119	2000 LH_{26}	—	June 1, 2000	Socorro	LINEAR	·	9.4 km	MPC · JPL
105120	2000 LJ_{26}	—	June 1, 2000	Socorro	LINEAR	·	4.3 km	MPC · JPL
105121	2000 LS_{31}	—	June 5, 2000	Anderson Mesa	LONEOS	·	7.1 km	MPC · JPL
105122	2000 LV_{31}	—	June 5, 2000	Anderson Mesa	LONEOS	H	1.4 km	MPC · JPL
105123	2000 LZ_{34}	—	June 1, 2000	Kitt Peak	Spacewatch	·	4.1 km	MPC · JPL
105124	2000 LC_{35}	—	June 1, 2000	Haleakala	NEAT	·	3.5 km	MPC · JPL
105125	2000 LO_{36}	—	June 1, 2000	Haleakala	NEAT	EUN	2.1 km	MPC · JPL
105126	2000 ME_{1}	—	June 24, 2000	Socorro	LINEAR	PHO	5.9 km	MPC · JPL
105127	2000 MH_{1}	—	June 25, 2000	Socorro	LINEAR	·	7.2 km	MPC · JPL
105128	2000 MW_{1}	—	June 27, 2000	Reedy Creek	J. Broughton	EUN	2.9 km	MPC · JPL
105129	2000 MH_{2}	—	June 29, 2000	Reedy Creek	J. Broughton	·	4.7 km	MPC · JPL
105130	2000 MJ_{2}	—	June 24, 2000	Haleakala	NEAT	·	5.5 km	MPC · JPL
105131	2000 MD_{3}	—	June 29, 2000	Farpoint	G. Hug	VER	6.0 km	MPC · JPL
105132	2000 MJ_{3}	—	June 24, 2000	Kitt Peak	Spacewatch	·	3.4 km	MPC · JPL
105133	2000 NA	—	July 1, 2000	Kitt Peak	Spacewatch	·	2.1 km	MPC · JPL
105134	2000 NS_{1}	—	July 3, 2000	Kitt Peak	Spacewatch	AGN	1.7 km	MPC · JPL
105135	2000 NT_{1}	—	July 4, 2000	Kitt Peak	Spacewatch	·	4.8 km	MPC · JPL
105136	2000 NB_{4}	—	July 3, 2000	Kitt Peak	Spacewatch	AGN	2.5 km	MPC · JPL
105137	2000 NA_{6}	—	July 8, 2000	Bisei SG Center	BATTeRS	·	9.1 km	MPC · JPL
105138	2000 NP_{6}	—	July 4, 2000	Kitt Peak	Spacewatch	NEM	3.3 km	MPC · JPL
105139	2000 NA_{7}	—	July 4, 2000	Kitt Peak	Spacewatch	·	2.9 km	MPC · JPL
105140	2000 NL_{10}	—	July 10, 2000	Socorro	LINEAR	ATE +1km	1.9 km	MPC · JPL
105141	2000 NF_{11}	—	July 7, 2000	Socorro	LINEAR	AMO	350 m	MPC · JPL
105142	2000 NA_{12}	—	July 4, 2000	Anderson Mesa	LONEOS	·	3.5 km	MPC · JPL
105143	2000 NJ_{12}	—	July 5, 2000	Anderson Mesa	LONEOS	·	9.7 km	MPC · JPL
105144	2000 NR_{12}	—	July 5, 2000	Anderson Mesa	LONEOS	·	7.5 km	MPC · JPL
105145	2000 NP_{14}	—	July 5, 2000	Anderson Mesa	LONEOS	·	2.1 km	MPC · JPL
105146	2000 NB_{15}	—	July 5, 2000	Anderson Mesa	LONEOS	EUN	3.0 km	MPC · JPL
105147	2000 NH_{15}	—	July 5, 2000	Anderson Mesa	LONEOS	·	1.5 km	MPC · JPL
105148	2000 NL_{17}	—	July 5, 2000	Anderson Mesa	LONEOS	·	3.5 km	MPC · JPL
105149	2000 NA_{19}	—	July 5, 2000	Anderson Mesa	LONEOS	·	4.1 km	MPC · JPL
105150	2000 NB_{20}	—	July 5, 2000	Anderson Mesa	LONEOS	DOR ·	6.1 km	MPC · JPL
105151	2000 NQ_{22}	—	July 7, 2000	Anderson Mesa	LONEOS	·	9.1 km	MPC · JPL
105152	2000 NV_{24}	—	July 4, 2000	Anderson Mesa	LONEOS	·	10 km	MPC · JPL
105153	2000 NS_{25}	—	July 4, 2000	Anderson Mesa	LONEOS	·	5.1 km	MPC · JPL
105154	2000 NA_{26}	—	July 4, 2000	Anderson Mesa	LONEOS	·	4.7 km	MPC · JPL
105155	2000 NG_{26}	—	July 4, 2000	Anderson Mesa	LONEOS	H	1.9 km	MPC · JPL
105156	2000 NW_{26}	—	July 4, 2000	Anderson Mesa	LONEOS	·	1.6 km	MPC · JPL
105157	2000 NA_{28}	—	July 3, 2000	Socorro	LINEAR	·	8.2 km	MPC · JPL
105158	2000 OL	—	July 23, 2000	Socorro	LINEAR	·	8.4 km	MPC · JPL
105159	2000 OQ_{5}	—	July 24, 2000	Socorro	LINEAR	·	5.6 km	MPC · JPL
105160	2000 OU_{5}	—	July 24, 2000	Socorro	LINEAR	·	2.0 km	MPC · JPL
105161	2000 OA_{6}	—	July 24, 2000	Socorro	LINEAR	·	5.4 km	MPC · JPL
105162	2000 OZ_{8}	—	July 31, 2000	Socorro	LINEAR	TIR	7.1 km	MPC · JPL
105163	2000 OW_{11}	—	July 23, 2000	Socorro	LINEAR	·	1.7 km	MPC · JPL
105164	2000 OM_{12}	—	July 23, 2000	Socorro	LINEAR	PHO	1.9 km	MPC · JPL
105165	2000 OQ_{12}	—	July 23, 2000	Socorro	LINEAR	EUN	2.4 km	MPC · JPL
105166	2000 OU_{12}	—	July 23, 2000	Socorro	LINEAR	·	5.5 km	MPC · JPL
105167	2000 OT_{13}	—	July 23, 2000	Socorro	LINEAR	·	3.5 km	MPC · JPL
105168	2000 OU_{14}	—	July 23, 2000	Socorro	LINEAR	·	3.4 km	MPC · JPL
105169	2000 OC_{15}	—	July 23, 2000	Socorro	LINEAR	·	1.6 km	MPC · JPL
105170	2000 OK_{15}	—	July 23, 2000	Socorro	LINEAR	·	6.6 km	MPC · JPL
105171	2000 OA_{19}	—	July 23, 2000	Socorro	LINEAR	·	5.9 km	MPC · JPL
105172	2000 OS_{20}	—	July 31, 2000	Socorro	LINEAR	TIR	6.9 km	MPC · JPL
105173	2000 OJ_{22}	—	July 30, 2000	Socorro	LINEAR	H	2.7 km	MPC · JPL
105174	2000 OK_{22}	—	July 31, 2000	Socorro	LINEAR	H	2.2 km	MPC · JPL
105175	2000 OO_{22}	—	July 31, 2000	Socorro	LINEAR	·	2.2 km	MPC · JPL
105176	2000 OW_{25}	—	July 23, 2000	Socorro	LINEAR	·	4.0 km	MPC · JPL
105177	2000 OA_{27}	—	July 23, 2000	Socorro	LINEAR	·	4.2 km	MPC · JPL
105178	2000 ON_{27}	—	July 23, 2000	Socorro	LINEAR	·	4.5 km	MPC · JPL
105179	2000 OP_{28}	—	July 30, 2000	Socorro	LINEAR	·	5.1 km	MPC · JPL
105180	2000 OK_{29}	—	July 30, 2000	Socorro	LINEAR	HNS	3.0 km	MPC · JPL
105181	2000 OS_{29}	—	July 30, 2000	Socorro	LINEAR	MAR	3.2 km	MPC · JPL
105182	2000 OF_{30}	—	July 30, 2000	Socorro	LINEAR	·	7.2 km	MPC · JPL
105183	2000 OO_{30}	—	July 30, 2000	Socorro	LINEAR	·	4.1 km	MPC · JPL
105184	2000 OZ_{30}	—	July 30, 2000	Socorro	LINEAR	·	3.0 km	MPC · JPL
105185	2000 OG_{31}	—	July 30, 2000	Socorro	LINEAR	·	3.5 km	MPC · JPL
105186	2000 OO_{31}	—	July 30, 2000	Socorro	LINEAR	DOR	6.5 km	MPC · JPL
105187	2000 OC_{33}	—	July 30, 2000	Socorro	LINEAR	·	1.8 km	MPC · JPL
105188	2000 OR_{33}	—	July 30, 2000	Socorro	LINEAR	·	6.2 km	MPC · JPL
105189	2000 OW_{34}	—	July 30, 2000	Socorro	LINEAR	GEF	2.8 km	MPC · JPL
105190	2000 OZ_{34}	—	July 30, 2000	Socorro	LINEAR	·	4.3 km	MPC · JPL
105191	2000 ON_{35}	—	July 31, 2000	Socorro	LINEAR	·	1.9 km	MPC · JPL
105192	2000 OV_{37}	—	July 30, 2000	Socorro	LINEAR	·	6.1 km	MPC · JPL
105193	2000 OY_{37}	—	July 30, 2000	Socorro	LINEAR	·	6.0 km	MPC · JPL
105194	2000 OA_{38}	—	July 30, 2000	Socorro	LINEAR	slow	9.1 km	MPC · JPL
105195	2000 OD_{38}	—	July 30, 2000	Socorro	LINEAR	·	4.5 km	MPC · JPL
105196	2000 OT_{38}	—	July 30, 2000	Socorro	LINEAR	EUN	2.7 km	MPC · JPL
105197	2000 OY_{38}	—	July 30, 2000	Socorro	LINEAR	·	5.3 km	MPC · JPL
105198	2000 OO_{39}	—	July 30, 2000	Socorro	LINEAR	·	4.4 km	MPC · JPL
105199	2000 OR_{39}	—	July 30, 2000	Socorro	LINEAR	·	4.1 km	MPC · JPL
105200	2000 OD_{40}	—	July 30, 2000	Socorro	LINEAR	·	1.5 km	MPC · JPL

== 105201–105300 ==
back to top

Designation			Discovery			Properties		Ref
Permanent	Provisional	Named after	Date	Site	Discoverer(s)	Category	Diam.	Ref
105201	2000 OG_{40}	—	July 30, 2000	Socorro	LINEAR	·	8.5 km	MPC · JPL
105202	2000 OJ_{40}	—	July 30, 2000	Socorro	LINEAR	·	5.6 km	MPC · JPL
105203	2000 OV_{41}	—	July 30, 2000	Socorro	LINEAR	SYL · CYB	11 km	MPC · JPL
105204	2000 OF_{42}	—	July 30, 2000	Socorro	LINEAR	·	4.2 km	MPC · JPL
105205	2000 OV_{43}	—	July 30, 2000	Socorro	LINEAR	·	5.3 km	MPC · JPL
105206	2000 OB_{44}	—	July 30, 2000	Socorro	LINEAR	·	1.8 km	MPC · JPL
105207	2000 OL_{46}	—	July 31, 2000	Socorro	LINEAR	·	6.3 km	MPC · JPL
105208	2000 OH_{48}	—	July 31, 2000	Socorro	LINEAR	·	1.5 km	MPC · JPL
105209	2000 OU_{48}	—	July 31, 2000	Socorro	LINEAR	·	7.4 km	MPC · JPL
105210	2000 OK_{52}	—	July 30, 2000	Socorro	LINEAR	·	12 km	MPC · JPL
105211 Sanden	2000 OM_{52}	Sanden	July 29, 2000	Siding Spring	R. H. McNaught	H	1.1 km	MPC · JPL
105212	2000 OP_{52}	—	July 31, 2000	Socorro	LINEAR	·	6.2 km	MPC · JPL
105213	2000 OV_{52}	—	July 31, 2000	Socorro	LINEAR	·	11 km	MPC · JPL
105214	2000 OL_{56}	—	July 29, 2000	Anderson Mesa	LONEOS	·	3.9 km	MPC · JPL
105215	2000 OR_{56}	—	July 29, 2000	Anderson Mesa	LONEOS	·	3.6 km	MPC · JPL
105216	2000 OS_{56}	—	July 29, 2000	Anderson Mesa	LONEOS	NEM	5.4 km	MPC · JPL
105217	2000 OX_{56}	—	July 29, 2000	Anderson Mesa	LONEOS	H	870 m	MPC · JPL
105218	2000 OJ_{57}	—	July 29, 2000	Anderson Mesa	LONEOS	·	4.6 km	MPC · JPL
105219	2000 ON_{57}	—	July 29, 2000	Anderson Mesa	LONEOS	·	5.9 km	MPC · JPL
105220	2000 OV_{58}	—	July 29, 2000	Anderson Mesa	LONEOS	·	3.6 km	MPC · JPL
105221	2000 OU_{60}	—	July 29, 2000	Anderson Mesa	LONEOS	·	3.8 km	MPC · JPL
105222 Oscarsaa	2000 OS_{69}	Oscarsaa	July 31, 2000	Cerro Tololo	M. W. Buie	·	1.6 km	MPC · JPL
105223	2000 PJ	—	August 1, 2000	Bergisch Gladbach	W. Bickel	NYS	1.3 km	MPC · JPL
105224	2000 PB_{1}	—	August 1, 2000	Socorro	LINEAR	·	4.8 km	MPC · JPL
105225	2000 PF_{1}	—	August 1, 2000	Socorro	LINEAR	·	7.0 km	MPC · JPL
105226	2000 PS_{2}	—	August 2, 2000	Socorro	LINEAR	·	3.3 km	MPC · JPL
105227	2000 PO_{5}	—	August 5, 2000	Prescott	P. G. Comba	EOS	4.2 km	MPC · JPL
105228	2000 PW_{5}	—	August 4, 2000	Bergisch Gladbach	W. Bickel	·	3.7 km	MPC · JPL
105229	2000 PY_{7}	—	August 3, 2000	Socorro	LINEAR	TIR	6.7 km	MPC · JPL
105230	2000 PC_{10}	—	August 1, 2000	Socorro	LINEAR	·	2.7 km	MPC · JPL
105231	2000 PJ_{10}	—	August 1, 2000	Socorro	LINEAR	GEF	2.9 km	MPC · JPL
105232	2000 PL_{11}	—	August 1, 2000	Socorro	LINEAR	EUP	11 km	MPC · JPL
105233	2000 PL_{12}	—	August 2, 2000	Socorro	LINEAR	·	3.2 km	MPC · JPL
105234	2000 PB_{13}	—	August 10, 2000	Socorro	LINEAR	PHO	2.8 km	MPC · JPL
105235	2000 PP_{13}	—	August 1, 2000	Socorro	LINEAR	·	4.9 km	MPC · JPL
105236	2000 PE_{20}	—	August 1, 2000	Socorro	LINEAR	·	2.7 km	MPC · JPL
105237	2000 PF_{20}	—	August 1, 2000	Socorro	LINEAR	·	3.1 km	MPC · JPL
105238	2000 PC_{21}	—	August 1, 2000	Socorro	LINEAR	HOF	5.5 km	MPC · JPL
105239	2000 PD_{21}	—	August 1, 2000	Socorro	LINEAR	KOR · fast	2.7 km	MPC · JPL
105240	2000 PA_{22}	—	August 1, 2000	Socorro	LINEAR	V	1.2 km	MPC · JPL
105241	2000 PT_{24}	—	August 3, 2000	Socorro	LINEAR	BRA	2.9 km	MPC · JPL
105242	2000 PY_{24}	—	August 3, 2000	Socorro	LINEAR	·	2.0 km	MPC · JPL
105243	2000 PB_{26}	—	August 4, 2000	Haleakala	NEAT	·	11 km	MPC · JPL
105244	2000 PC_{26}	—	August 5, 2000	Haleakala	NEAT	·	6.8 km	MPC · JPL
105245	2000 PO_{27}	—	August 3, 2000	Kitt Peak	Spacewatch	EUN	2.9 km	MPC · JPL
105246	2000 QH_{2}	—	August 24, 2000	Socorro	LINEAR	H	1.2 km	MPC · JPL
105247	2000 QH_{3}	—	August 24, 2000	Socorro	LINEAR	·	1.6 km	MPC · JPL
105248	2000 QM_{3}	—	August 24, 2000	Socorro	LINEAR	·	3.6 km	MPC · JPL
105249	2000 QB_{4}	—	August 24, 2000	Socorro	LINEAR	·	1.5 km	MPC · JPL
105250	2000 QJ_{6}	—	August 24, 2000	Starkenburg Observatory	Starkenburg	·	1.3 km	MPC · JPL
105251	2000 QP_{6}	—	August 24, 2000	Gnosca	S. Sposetti	·	7.2 km	MPC · JPL
105252	2000 QD_{7}	—	August 24, 2000	Socorro	LINEAR	H	1.1 km	MPC · JPL
105253	2000 QF_{10}	—	August 24, 2000	Socorro	LINEAR	·	1.6 km	MPC · JPL
105254	2000 QQ_{10}	—	August 24, 2000	Socorro	LINEAR	NEM	5.3 km	MPC · JPL
105255	2000 QR_{10}	—	August 24, 2000	Socorro	LINEAR	·	6.5 km	MPC · JPL
105256	2000 QQ_{11}	—	August 24, 2000	Socorro	LINEAR	·	1.9 km	MPC · JPL
105257	2000 QD_{13}	—	August 24, 2000	Socorro	LINEAR	·	1.2 km	MPC · JPL
105258	2000 QM_{13}	—	August 24, 2000	Socorro	LINEAR	MAS	1.2 km	MPC · JPL
105259	2000 QU_{13}	—	August 24, 2000	Socorro	LINEAR	·	4.2 km	MPC · JPL
105260	2000 QC_{14}	—	August 24, 2000	Socorro	LINEAR	·	3.9 km	MPC · JPL
105261	2000 QS_{14}	—	August 24, 2000	Socorro	LINEAR	·	3.1 km	MPC · JPL
105262	2000 QH_{15}	—	August 24, 2000	Socorro	LINEAR	·	3.5 km	MPC · JPL
105263	2000 QG_{17}	—	August 24, 2000	Socorro	LINEAR	·	5.6 km	MPC · JPL
105264	2000 QE_{18}	—	August 24, 2000	Socorro	LINEAR	·	5.2 km	MPC · JPL
105265	2000 QQ_{18}	—	August 24, 2000	Socorro	LINEAR	KOR	2.7 km	MPC · JPL
105266	2000 QC_{21}	—	August 24, 2000	Socorro	LINEAR	V	1.2 km	MPC · JPL
105267	2000 QB_{22}	—	August 24, 2000	Socorro	LINEAR	·	1.5 km	MPC · JPL
105268	2000 QK_{22}	—	August 25, 2000	Socorro	LINEAR	(5)	2.7 km	MPC · JPL
105269	2000 QV_{23}	—	August 25, 2000	Socorro	LINEAR	·	4.3 km	MPC · JPL
105270	2000 QF_{24}	—	August 25, 2000	Socorro	LINEAR	·	1.7 km	MPC · JPL
105271	2000 QN_{24}	—	August 25, 2000	Socorro	LINEAR	·	2.1 km	MPC · JPL
105272	2000 QD_{25}	—	August 26, 2000	Emerald Lane	L. Ball	V	1.4 km	MPC · JPL
105273	2000 QW_{25}	—	August 26, 2000	Socorro	LINEAR	·	3.2 km	MPC · JPL
105274	2000 QL_{27}	—	August 24, 2000	Socorro	LINEAR	·	2.2 km	MPC · JPL
105275	2000 QA_{28}	—	August 24, 2000	Socorro	LINEAR	·	6.1 km	MPC · JPL
105276	2000 QO_{30}	—	August 25, 2000	Socorro	LINEAR	·	8.1 km	MPC · JPL
105277	2000 QE_{33}	—	August 26, 2000	Socorro	LINEAR	·	9.5 km	MPC · JPL
105278	2000 QK_{33}	—	August 26, 2000	Socorro	LINEAR	·	6.0 km	MPC · JPL
105279	2000 QQ_{33}	—	August 26, 2000	Socorro	LINEAR	H	1.1 km	MPC · JPL
105280	2000 QD_{35}	—	August 28, 2000	Ondřejov	P. Kušnirák	·	4.9 km	MPC · JPL
105281	2000 QH_{36}	—	August 24, 2000	Socorro	LINEAR	·	4.0 km	MPC · JPL
105282	2000 QK_{36}	—	August 24, 2000	Socorro	LINEAR	EUN	2.6 km	MPC · JPL
105283	2000 QQ_{38}	—	August 24, 2000	Socorro	LINEAR	·	1.3 km	MPC · JPL
105284	2000 QJ_{40}	—	August 24, 2000	Socorro	LINEAR	·	2.8 km	MPC · JPL
105285	2000 QD_{42}	—	August 24, 2000	Socorro	LINEAR	·	4.6 km	MPC · JPL
105286	2000 QG_{42}	—	August 24, 2000	Socorro	LINEAR	·	5.8 km	MPC · JPL
105287	2000 QF_{44}	—	August 24, 2000	Socorro	LINEAR	·	1.4 km	MPC · JPL
105288	2000 QL_{44}	—	August 24, 2000	Socorro	LINEAR	·	3.4 km	MPC · JPL
105289	2000 QH_{46}	—	August 24, 2000	Socorro	LINEAR	·	1.7 km	MPC · JPL
105290	2000 QX_{47}	—	August 24, 2000	Socorro	LINEAR	·	6.7 km	MPC · JPL
105291	2000 QY_{47}	—	August 24, 2000	Socorro	LINEAR	·	6.4 km	MPC · JPL
105292	2000 QP_{49}	—	August 24, 2000	Socorro	LINEAR	·	1.5 km	MPC · JPL
105293	2000 QY_{49}	—	August 24, 2000	Socorro	LINEAR	·	3.2 km	MPC · JPL
105294	2000 QG_{50}	—	August 24, 2000	Socorro	LINEAR	·	1.6 km	MPC · JPL
105295	2000 QN_{50}	—	August 24, 2000	Socorro	LINEAR	MAS	1.4 km	MPC · JPL
105296	2000 QM_{51}	—	August 24, 2000	Socorro	LINEAR	KOR	3.0 km	MPC · JPL
105297	2000 QA_{53}	—	August 24, 2000	Socorro	LINEAR	V	1.2 km	MPC · JPL
105298	2000 QZ_{53}	—	August 25, 2000	Socorro	LINEAR	·	5.9 km	MPC · JPL
105299	2000 QU_{54}	—	August 25, 2000	Socorro	LINEAR	·	1.9 km	MPC · JPL
105300	2000 QL_{55}	—	August 25, 2000	Socorro	LINEAR	·	3.3 km	MPC · JPL

== 105301–105400 ==
back to top

Designation			Discovery			Properties		Ref
Permanent	Provisional	Named after	Date	Site	Discoverer(s)	Category	Diam.	Ref
105301	2000 QS_{55}	—	August 25, 2000	Socorro	LINEAR	·	3.5 km	MPC · JPL
105302	2000 QF_{57}	—	August 26, 2000	Socorro	LINEAR	·	2.2 km	MPC · JPL
105303	2000 QV_{57}	—	August 26, 2000	Socorro	LINEAR	EUN	2.9 km	MPC · JPL
105304	2000 QY_{58}	—	August 26, 2000	Socorro	LINEAR	·	3.4 km	MPC · JPL
105305	2000 QN_{60}	—	August 26, 2000	Socorro	LINEAR	·	3.9 km	MPC · JPL
105306	2000 QS_{60}	—	August 26, 2000	Socorro	LINEAR	EMA	6.1 km	MPC · JPL
105307	2000 QT_{60}	—	August 26, 2000	Socorro	LINEAR	·	3.3 km	MPC · JPL
105308	2000 QY_{63}	—	August 28, 2000	Socorro	LINEAR	·	5.2 km	MPC · JPL
105309	2000 QX_{65}	—	August 28, 2000	Socorro	LINEAR	GEF	2.6 km	MPC · JPL
105310	2000 QM_{67}	—	August 28, 2000	Socorro	LINEAR	TIR	5.4 km	MPC · JPL
105311	2000 QL_{70}	—	August 28, 2000	Socorro	LINEAR	H	1.2 km	MPC · JPL
105312	2000 QC_{71}	—	August 30, 2000	Needville	J. Dellinger, C. Gustava	·	3.5 km	MPC · JPL
105313	2000 QV_{71}	—	August 24, 2000	Socorro	LINEAR	AGN	2.7 km	MPC · JPL
105314	2000 QC_{72}	—	August 24, 2000	Socorro	LINEAR	AGN	2.3 km	MPC · JPL
105315	2000 QY_{72}	—	August 24, 2000	Socorro	LINEAR	·	4.3 km	MPC · JPL
105316	2000 QN_{73}	—	August 24, 2000	Socorro	LINEAR	·	1.6 km	MPC · JPL
105317	2000 QU_{74}	—	August 24, 2000	Socorro	LINEAR	·	4.9 km	MPC · JPL
105318	2000 QB_{75}	—	August 24, 2000	Socorro	LINEAR	KOR	3.1 km	MPC · JPL
105319	2000 QL_{75}	—	August 24, 2000	Socorro	LINEAR	·	2.0 km	MPC · JPL
105320	2000 QP_{75}	—	August 24, 2000	Socorro	LINEAR	WIT	1.9 km	MPC · JPL
105321	2000 QY_{75}	—	August 24, 2000	Socorro	LINEAR	·	4.8 km	MPC · JPL
105322	2000 QD_{76}	—	August 24, 2000	Socorro	LINEAR	·	3.9 km	MPC · JPL
105323	2000 QQ_{78}	—	August 24, 2000	Socorro	LINEAR	·	5.1 km	MPC · JPL
105324	2000 QM_{81}	—	August 24, 2000	Socorro	LINEAR	KOR	3.1 km	MPC · JPL
105325	2000 QH_{82}	—	August 24, 2000	Socorro	LINEAR	NYS	2.2 km	MPC · JPL
105326	2000 QS_{82}	—	August 24, 2000	Socorro	LINEAR	·	7.3 km	MPC · JPL
105327	2000 QF_{83}	—	August 24, 2000	Socorro	LINEAR	·	6.5 km	MPC · JPL
105328	2000 QS_{83}	—	August 24, 2000	Socorro	LINEAR	(5)	2.5 km	MPC · JPL
105329	2000 QA_{84}	—	August 24, 2000	Socorro	LINEAR	·	5.7 km	MPC · JPL
105330	2000 QG_{84}	—	August 24, 2000	Socorro	LINEAR	·	2.0 km	MPC · JPL
105331	2000 QK_{84}	—	August 25, 2000	Socorro	LINEAR	·	2.9 km	MPC · JPL
105332	2000 QR_{84}	—	August 25, 2000	Socorro	LINEAR	·	1.7 km	MPC · JPL
105333	2000 QH_{85}	—	August 25, 2000	Socorro	LINEAR	MRX	2.6 km	MPC · JPL
105334	2000 QQ_{85}	—	August 25, 2000	Socorro	LINEAR	DOR	5.7 km	MPC · JPL
105335	2000 QZ_{85}	—	August 25, 2000	Socorro	LINEAR	·	3.7 km	MPC · JPL
105336	2000 QC_{86}	—	August 25, 2000	Socorro	LINEAR	·	6.6 km	MPC · JPL
105337	2000 QR_{86}	—	August 25, 2000	Socorro	LINEAR	BRA	2.5 km	MPC · JPL
105338	2000 QD_{89}	—	August 25, 2000	Socorro	LINEAR	·	6.0 km	MPC · JPL
105339	2000 QL_{91}	—	August 25, 2000	Socorro	LINEAR	·	12 km	MPC · JPL
105340	2000 QC_{93}	—	August 25, 2000	Socorro	LINEAR	·	6.8 km	MPC · JPL
105341	2000 QY_{93}	—	August 26, 2000	Socorro	LINEAR	·	5.5 km	MPC · JPL
105342	2000 QE_{94}	—	August 26, 2000	Socorro	LINEAR	·	5.7 km	MPC · JPL
105343	2000 QJ_{94}	—	August 26, 2000	Socorro	LINEAR	·	6.0 km	MPC · JPL
105344	2000 QM_{94}	—	August 26, 2000	Socorro	LINEAR	·	3.5 km	MPC · JPL
105345	2000 QG_{95}	—	August 26, 2000	Socorro	LINEAR	·	2.0 km	MPC · JPL
105346	2000 QN_{96}	—	August 28, 2000	Socorro	LINEAR	HYG	7.9 km	MPC · JPL
105347	2000 QB_{98}	—	August 28, 2000	Socorro	LINEAR	·	7.2 km	MPC · JPL
105348	2000 QH_{99}	—	August 28, 2000	Socorro	LINEAR	·	1.4 km	MPC · JPL
105349	2000 QC_{100}	—	August 28, 2000	Socorro	LINEAR	NYS ·	2.6 km	MPC · JPL
105350	2000 QN_{100}	—	August 28, 2000	Socorro	LINEAR	·	4.4 km	MPC · JPL
105351	2000 QV_{101}	—	August 28, 2000	Socorro	LINEAR	·	5.5 km	MPC · JPL
105352	2000 QB_{104}	—	August 28, 2000	Socorro	LINEAR	·	5.3 km	MPC · JPL
105353	2000 QN_{105}	—	August 28, 2000	Socorro	LINEAR	·	5.6 km	MPC · JPL
105354	2000 QF_{107}	—	August 29, 2000	Socorro	LINEAR	·	6.2 km	MPC · JPL
105355	2000 QD_{108}	—	August 29, 2000	Socorro	LINEAR	·	2.6 km	MPC · JPL
105356	2000 QF_{108}	—	August 29, 2000	Socorro	LINEAR	CYB	6.3 km	MPC · JPL
105357	2000 QF_{109}	—	August 29, 2000	Socorro	LINEAR	·	1.9 km	MPC · JPL
105358	2000 QO_{110}	—	August 24, 2000	Socorro	LINEAR	·	3.8 km	MPC · JPL
105359	2000 QS_{110}	—	August 24, 2000	Socorro	LINEAR	T_{j} (2.99)	7.0 km	MPC · JPL
105360	2000 QU_{110}	—	August 24, 2000	Socorro	LINEAR	·	6.7 km	MPC · JPL
105361	2000 QG_{112}	—	August 24, 2000	Socorro	LINEAR	·	4.5 km	MPC · JPL
105362	2000 QT_{112}	—	August 24, 2000	Socorro	LINEAR	MAR	1.6 km	MPC · JPL
105363	2000 QK_{115}	—	August 25, 2000	Socorro	LINEAR	V	1.3 km	MPC · JPL
105364	2000 QM_{116}	—	August 28, 2000	Socorro	LINEAR	·	1.7 km	MPC · JPL
105365	2000 QY_{117}	—	August 25, 2000	Socorro	LINEAR	TIR	4.3 km	MPC · JPL
105366	2000 QZ_{121}	—	August 25, 2000	Socorro	LINEAR	·	4.1 km	MPC · JPL
105367	2000 QO_{123}	—	August 25, 2000	Socorro	LINEAR	·	6.3 km	MPC · JPL
105368	2000 QG_{124}	—	August 26, 2000	Socorro	LINEAR	V	1.2 km	MPC · JPL
105369	2000 QW_{125}	—	August 31, 2000	Socorro	LINEAR	·	5.9 km	MPC · JPL
105370	2000 QY_{125}	—	August 31, 2000	Socorro	LINEAR	(18466)	4.0 km	MPC · JPL
105371	2000 QD_{126}	—	August 31, 2000	Socorro	LINEAR	·	1.8 km	MPC · JPL
105372	2000 QF_{127}	—	August 24, 2000	Socorro	LINEAR	·	1.6 km	MPC · JPL
105373	2000 QG_{127}	—	August 24, 2000	Socorro	LINEAR	·	6.4 km	MPC · JPL
105374	2000 QG_{128}	—	August 24, 2000	Socorro	LINEAR	·	4.3 km	MPC · JPL
105375	2000 QC_{129}	—	August 26, 2000	Socorro	LINEAR	·	1.3 km	MPC · JPL
105376	2000 QK_{129}	—	August 31, 2000	Socorro	LINEAR	·	2.1 km	MPC · JPL
105377	2000 QA_{130}	—	August 31, 2000	Socorro	LINEAR	H	1.5 km	MPC · JPL
105378	2000 QF_{130}	—	August 31, 2000	Socorro	LINEAR	·	3.6 km	MPC · JPL
105379	2000 QR_{130}	—	August 31, 2000	Prescott	P. G. Comba	·	1.3 km	MPC · JPL
105380	2000 QK_{131}	—	August 24, 2000	Socorro	LINEAR	HOF	6.3 km	MPC · JPL
105381	2000 QO_{131}	—	August 24, 2000	Socorro	LINEAR	·	7.3 km	MPC · JPL
105382	2000 QP_{132}	—	August 26, 2000	Socorro	LINEAR	·	7.2 km	MPC · JPL
105383	2000 QT_{133}	—	August 26, 2000	Socorro	LINEAR	(194)	5.2 km	MPC · JPL
105384	2000 QO_{136}	—	August 29, 2000	Socorro	LINEAR	NYS	1.3 km	MPC · JPL
105385	2000 QZ_{137}	—	August 31, 2000	Socorro	LINEAR	DOR	4.9 km	MPC · JPL
105386	2000 QC_{138}	—	August 31, 2000	Socorro	LINEAR	NYS	2.3 km	MPC · JPL
105387	2000 QL_{138}	—	August 31, 2000	Socorro	LINEAR	·	1.5 km	MPC · JPL
105388	2000 QO_{138}	—	August 31, 2000	Socorro	LINEAR	·	9.2 km	MPC · JPL
105389	2000 QT_{138}	—	August 31, 2000	Socorro	LINEAR	EOS	4.0 km	MPC · JPL
105390	2000 QZ_{138}	—	August 31, 2000	Socorro	LINEAR	·	1.6 km	MPC · JPL
105391	2000 QA_{139}	—	August 31, 2000	Socorro	LINEAR	·	3.5 km	MPC · JPL
105392	2000 QB_{140}	—	August 31, 2000	Socorro	LINEAR	·	5.1 km	MPC · JPL
105393	2000 QT_{141}	—	August 31, 2000	Socorro	LINEAR	·	7.3 km	MPC · JPL
105394	2000 QU_{141}	—	August 31, 2000	Socorro	LINEAR	THM	6.0 km	MPC · JPL
105395	2000 QD_{142}	—	August 31, 2000	Socorro	LINEAR	THM	4.9 km	MPC · JPL
105396	2000 QN_{142}	—	August 31, 2000	Socorro	LINEAR	·	5.9 km	MPC · JPL
105397	2000 QA_{143}	—	August 31, 2000	Socorro	LINEAR	MAS	1.3 km	MPC · JPL
105398	2000 QX_{143}	—	August 31, 2000	Socorro	LINEAR	H	1.3 km	MPC · JPL
105399	2000 QG_{144}	—	August 31, 2000	Socorro	LINEAR	·	4.8 km	MPC · JPL
105400	2000 QJ_{144}	—	August 31, 2000	Socorro	LINEAR	·	6.1 km	MPC · JPL

== 105401–105500 ==
back to top

Designation			Discovery			Properties		Ref
Permanent	Provisional	Named after	Date	Site	Discoverer(s)	Category	Diam.	Ref
105401	2000 QM_{144}	—	August 31, 2000	Socorro	LINEAR	·	3.6 km	MPC · JPL
105402	2000 QZ_{144}	—	August 31, 2000	Socorro	LINEAR	·	2.2 km	MPC · JPL
105403	2000 QU_{145}	—	August 31, 2000	Socorro	LINEAR	V	1.3 km	MPC · JPL
105404	2000 QZ_{145}	—	August 31, 2000	Socorro	LINEAR	·	1.9 km	MPC · JPL
105405	2000 QM_{148}	—	August 27, 2000	Kvistaberg	Uppsala-DLR Asteroid Survey	·	1.2 km	MPC · JPL
105406	2000 QN_{150}	—	August 25, 2000	Socorro	LINEAR	·	1.6 km	MPC · JPL
105407	2000 QE_{153}	—	August 29, 2000	Socorro	LINEAR	·	9.4 km	MPC · JPL
105408	2000 QO_{153}	—	August 29, 2000	Socorro	LINEAR	·	1.6 km	MPC · JPL
105409	2000 QX_{153}	—	August 29, 2000	Socorro	LINEAR	·	1.8 km	MPC · JPL
105410	2000 QL_{154}	—	August 31, 2000	Socorro	LINEAR	EOS	3.6 km	MPC · JPL
105411	2000 QQ_{154}	—	August 31, 2000	Socorro	LINEAR	·	4.3 km	MPC · JPL
105412	2000 QY_{154}	—	August 31, 2000	Socorro	LINEAR	GEF	3.2 km	MPC · JPL
105413	2000 QF_{155}	—	August 31, 2000	Socorro	LINEAR	·	4.6 km	MPC · JPL
105414	2000 QA_{159}	—	August 31, 2000	Socorro	LINEAR	VER	6.2 km	MPC · JPL
105415	2000 QW_{159}	—	August 31, 2000	Socorro	LINEAR	·	5.3 km	MPC · JPL
105416	2000 QY_{161}	—	August 31, 2000	Socorro	LINEAR	TEL	2.4 km	MPC · JPL
105417	2000 QL_{163}	—	August 31, 2000	Socorro	LINEAR	·	1.7 km	MPC · JPL
105418	2000 QR_{164}	—	August 31, 2000	Socorro	LINEAR	EOS ·	3.3 km	MPC · JPL
105419	2000 QR_{165}	—	August 31, 2000	Socorro	LINEAR	·	3.6 km	MPC · JPL
105420	2000 QB_{167}	—	August 31, 2000	Socorro	LINEAR	·	6.0 km	MPC · JPL
105421	2000 QL_{167}	—	August 31, 2000	Socorro	LINEAR	·	6.8 km	MPC · JPL
105422	2000 QW_{167}	—	August 31, 2000	Socorro	LINEAR	DOR	4.9 km	MPC · JPL
105423	2000 QA_{168}	—	August 31, 2000	Socorro	LINEAR	NAE ·	6.7 km	MPC · JPL
105424	2000 QD_{173}	—	August 31, 2000	Socorro	LINEAR	·	5.6 km	MPC · JPL
105425	2000 QF_{173}	—	August 31, 2000	Socorro	LINEAR	·	1.7 km	MPC · JPL
105426	2000 QK_{173}	—	August 31, 2000	Socorro	LINEAR	·	2.0 km	MPC · JPL
105427	2000 QL_{173}	—	August 31, 2000	Socorro	LINEAR	·	8.3 km	MPC · JPL
105428	2000 QT_{173}	—	August 31, 2000	Socorro	LINEAR	·	5.9 km	MPC · JPL
105429	2000 QN_{174}	—	August 31, 2000	Socorro	LINEAR	·	4.5 km	MPC · JPL
105430	2000 QR_{174}	—	August 31, 2000	Socorro	LINEAR	·	6.4 km	MPC · JPL
105431	2000 QH_{176}	—	August 31, 2000	Socorro	LINEAR	·	3.6 km	MPC · JPL
105432	2000 QJ_{176}	—	August 31, 2000	Socorro	LINEAR	GEF	2.6 km	MPC · JPL
105433	2000 QN_{176}	—	August 31, 2000	Socorro	LINEAR	·	6.3 km	MPC · JPL
105434	2000 QA_{177}	—	August 31, 2000	Socorro	LINEAR	MRX	2.7 km	MPC · JPL
105435	2000 QJ_{177}	—	August 31, 2000	Socorro	LINEAR	·	11 km	MPC · JPL
105436	2000 QS_{177}	—	August 31, 2000	Socorro	LINEAR	AGN	2.0 km	MPC · JPL
105437	2000 QR_{178}	—	August 31, 2000	Socorro	LINEAR	EOS	3.1 km	MPC · JPL
105438	2000 QD_{179}	—	August 31, 2000	Socorro	LINEAR	·	4.0 km	MPC · JPL
105439	2000 QM_{179}	—	August 31, 2000	Socorro	LINEAR	KOR	2.8 km	MPC · JPL
105440	2000 QF_{180}	—	August 31, 2000	Socorro	LINEAR	H	1.5 km	MPC · JPL
105441	2000 QU_{180}	—	August 31, 2000	Socorro	LINEAR	·	3.1 km	MPC · JPL
105442	2000 QW_{180}	—	August 31, 2000	Socorro	LINEAR	·	3.4 km	MPC · JPL
105443	2000 QY_{180}	—	August 31, 2000	Socorro	LINEAR	·	2.9 km	MPC · JPL
105444	2000 QU_{182}	—	August 31, 2000	Socorro	LINEAR	TIR	4.1 km	MPC · JPL
105445	2000 QW_{182}	—	August 24, 2000	Socorro	LINEAR	H	2.3 km	MPC · JPL
105446	2000 QS_{183}	—	August 26, 2000	Socorro	LINEAR	·	3.8 km	MPC · JPL
105447	2000 QU_{183}	—	August 26, 2000	Socorro	LINEAR	·	5.8 km	MPC · JPL
105448	2000 QZ_{190}	—	August 26, 2000	Socorro	LINEAR	·	3.1 km	MPC · JPL
105449	2000 QA_{191}	—	August 26, 2000	Socorro	LINEAR	EUN	1.9 km	MPC · JPL
105450	2000 QE_{191}	—	August 26, 2000	Socorro	LINEAR	·	4.8 km	MPC · JPL
105451	2000 QZ_{192}	—	August 28, 2000	Socorro	LINEAR	·	5.8 km	MPC · JPL
105452	2000 QB_{193}	—	August 29, 2000	Socorro	LINEAR	·	3.4 km	MPC · JPL
105453	2000 QX_{194}	—	August 26, 2000	Socorro	LINEAR	·	4.5 km	MPC · JPL
105454	2000 QP_{195}	—	August 26, 2000	Socorro	LINEAR	GEF	2.7 km	MPC · JPL
105455	2000 QJ_{197}	—	August 29, 2000	Socorro	LINEAR	·	1.8 km	MPC · JPL
105456	2000 QK_{197}	—	August 29, 2000	Socorro	LINEAR	NYS	3.1 km	MPC · JPL
105457	2000 QG_{198}	—	August 29, 2000	Socorro	LINEAR	EOS	3.5 km	MPC · JPL
105458	2000 QN_{199}	—	August 29, 2000	Socorro	LINEAR	·	7.1 km	MPC · JPL
105459	2000 QX_{199}	—	August 29, 2000	Socorro	LINEAR	·	1.3 km	MPC · JPL
105460	2000 QV_{201}	—	August 29, 2000	Socorro	LINEAR	V	1.2 km	MPC · JPL
105461	2000 QH_{205}	—	August 31, 2000	Socorro	LINEAR	·	5.0 km	MPC · JPL
105462	2000 QG_{206}	—	August 31, 2000	Socorro	LINEAR	·	3.1 km	MPC · JPL
105463	2000 QT_{206}	—	August 31, 2000	Socorro	LINEAR	EOS	3.8 km	MPC · JPL
105464	2000 QD_{207}	—	August 31, 2000	Socorro	LINEAR	MAS	1.6 km	MPC · JPL
105465	2000 QO_{207}	—	August 31, 2000	Socorro	LINEAR	·	5.6 km	MPC · JPL
105466	2000 QP_{207}	—	August 31, 2000	Socorro	LINEAR	·	4.7 km	MPC · JPL
105467	2000 QD_{208}	—	August 31, 2000	Socorro	LINEAR	·	5.0 km	MPC · JPL
105468	2000 QF_{208}	—	August 31, 2000	Socorro	LINEAR	·	2.5 km	MPC · JPL
105469	2000 QA_{209}	—	August 31, 2000	Socorro	LINEAR	·	1.1 km	MPC · JPL
105470	2000 QE_{209}	—	August 31, 2000	Socorro	LINEAR	·	2.3 km	MPC · JPL
105471	2000 QP_{209}	—	August 31, 2000	Socorro	LINEAR	·	3.8 km	MPC · JPL
105472	2000 QG_{210}	—	August 31, 2000	Socorro	LINEAR	·	3.9 km	MPC · JPL
105473	2000 QA_{211}	—	August 31, 2000	Socorro	LINEAR	THM	3.9 km	MPC · JPL
105474	2000 QJ_{211}	—	August 31, 2000	Socorro	LINEAR	·	4.9 km	MPC · JPL
105475	2000 QK_{211}	—	August 31, 2000	Socorro	LINEAR	·	1.2 km	MPC · JPL
105476	2000 QM_{211}	—	August 31, 2000	Socorro	LINEAR	KOR	2.8 km	MPC · JPL
105477	2000 QO_{213}	—	August 31, 2000	Socorro	LINEAR	·	1.8 km	MPC · JPL
105478	2000 QS_{213}	—	August 31, 2000	Socorro	LINEAR	MAS	1.5 km	MPC · JPL
105479	2000 QO_{214}	—	August 31, 2000	Socorro	LINEAR	·	1.3 km	MPC · JPL
105480	2000 QF_{215}	—	August 31, 2000	Socorro	LINEAR	·	2.4 km	MPC · JPL
105481	2000 QB_{216}	—	August 31, 2000	Socorro	LINEAR	·	6.4 km	MPC · JPL
105482	2000 QJ_{216}	—	August 31, 2000	Socorro	LINEAR	MIS	4.0 km	MPC · JPL
105483	2000 QK_{216}	—	August 31, 2000	Socorro	LINEAR	·	1.6 km	MPC · JPL
105484	2000 QV_{216}	—	August 31, 2000	Socorro	LINEAR	·	4.5 km	MPC · JPL
105485	2000 QW_{216}	—	August 31, 2000	Socorro	LINEAR	·	2.3 km	MPC · JPL
105486	2000 QX_{216}	—	August 31, 2000	Socorro	LINEAR	·	4.5 km	MPC · JPL
105487	2000 QS_{219}	—	August 20, 2000	Anderson Mesa	LONEOS	·	6.9 km	MPC · JPL
105488	2000 QX_{220}	—	August 21, 2000	Anderson Mesa	LONEOS	·	4.7 km	MPC · JPL
105489	2000 QE_{221}	—	August 21, 2000	Anderson Mesa	LONEOS	·	2.8 km	MPC · JPL
105490	2000 QS_{223}	—	August 24, 2000	Socorro	LINEAR	·	3.7 km	MPC · JPL
105491	2000 QM_{227}	—	August 31, 2000	Socorro	LINEAR	·	4.4 km	MPC · JPL
105492	2000 QO_{227}	—	August 31, 2000	Socorro	LINEAR	·	6.3 km	MPC · JPL
105493	2000 QB_{228}	—	August 31, 2000	Socorro	LINEAR	KOR	2.6 km	MPC · JPL
105494	2000 QF_{228}	—	August 31, 2000	Socorro	LINEAR	·	4.9 km	MPC · JPL
105495	2000 QW_{228}	—	August 31, 2000	Socorro	LINEAR	EOS	3.8 km	MPC · JPL
105496	2000 QC_{229}	—	August 31, 2000	Socorro	LINEAR	·	3.9 km	MPC · JPL
105497	2000 QF_{229}	—	August 31, 2000	Socorro	LINEAR	EOS	3.9 km	MPC · JPL
105498	2000 QM_{230}	—	August 31, 2000	Socorro	LINEAR	·	6.9 km	MPC · JPL
105499	2000 QS_{230}	—	August 31, 2000	Socorro	LINEAR	·	4.4 km	MPC · JPL
105500	2000 QL_{231}	—	August 29, 2000	Socorro	LINEAR	·	2.3 km	MPC · JPL

== 105501–105600 ==
back to top

Designation			Discovery			Properties		Ref
Permanent	Provisional	Named after	Date	Site	Discoverer(s)	Category	Diam.	Ref
105501	2000 QA_{232}	—	August 29, 2000	Socorro	LINEAR	·	4.2 km	MPC · JPL
105502	2000 QN_{250}	—	August 20, 2000	Anderson Mesa	LONEOS	EOS	4.1 km	MPC · JPL
105503	2000 RG_{1}	—	September 1, 2000	Socorro	LINEAR	NYS	1.7 km	MPC · JPL
105504	2000 RX_{2}	—	September 1, 2000	Socorro	LINEAR	EUP	12 km	MPC · JPL
105505	2000 RK_{3}	—	September 1, 2000	Socorro	LINEAR	·	5.9 km	MPC · JPL
105506	2000 RO_{3}	—	September 1, 2000	Socorro	LINEAR	·	3.1 km	MPC · JPL
105507	2000 RZ_{6}	—	September 1, 2000	Socorro	LINEAR	·	4.9 km	MPC · JPL
105508	2000 RA_{9}	—	September 3, 2000	Emerald Lane	L. Ball	EOS	3.5 km	MPC · JPL
105509	2000 RL_{9}	—	September 1, 2000	Socorro	LINEAR	·	4.2 km	MPC · JPL
105510	2000 RJ_{11}	—	September 1, 2000	Socorro	LINEAR	·	5.9 km	MPC · JPL
105511	2000 RF_{13}	—	September 1, 2000	Socorro	LINEAR	·	7.8 km	MPC · JPL
105512	2000 RJ_{14}	—	September 1, 2000	Socorro	LINEAR	EOS	4.2 km	MPC · JPL
105513	2000 RL_{14}	—	September 1, 2000	Socorro	LINEAR	·	5.4 km	MPC · JPL
105514	2000 RO_{15}	—	September 1, 2000	Socorro	LINEAR	EOS	3.4 km	MPC · JPL
105515	2000 RQ_{15}	—	September 1, 2000	Socorro	LINEAR	EOS	3.5 km	MPC · JPL
105516	2000 RY_{15}	—	September 1, 2000	Socorro	LINEAR	·	5.1 km	MPC · JPL
105517	2000 RA_{16}	—	September 1, 2000	Socorro	LINEAR	·	6.8 km	MPC · JPL
105518	2000 RP_{16}	—	September 1, 2000	Socorro	LINEAR	·	7.2 km	MPC · JPL
105519	2000 RP_{18}	—	September 1, 2000	Socorro	LINEAR	·	4.2 km	MPC · JPL
105520	2000 RW_{22}	—	September 1, 2000	Socorro	LINEAR	HYG	5.4 km	MPC · JPL
105521	2000 RM_{24}	—	September 1, 2000	Socorro	LINEAR	(7605)	10 km	MPC · JPL
105522	2000 RH_{25}	—	September 1, 2000	Socorro	LINEAR	EUP	7.8 km	MPC · JPL
105523	2000 RC_{26}	—	September 1, 2000	Socorro	LINEAR	·	1.6 km	MPC · JPL
105524	2000 RF_{26}	—	September 1, 2000	Socorro	LINEAR	·	3.0 km	MPC · JPL
105525	2000 RL_{26}	—	September 1, 2000	Socorro	LINEAR	·	3.6 km	MPC · JPL
105526	2000 RQ_{26}	—	September 1, 2000	Socorro	LINEAR	·	4.5 km	MPC · JPL
105527	2000 RW_{26}	—	September 1, 2000	Socorro	LINEAR	EOS	3.3 km	MPC · JPL
105528	2000 RZ_{26}	—	September 1, 2000	Socorro	LINEAR	V	1.2 km	MPC · JPL
105529	2000 RG_{27}	—	September 1, 2000	Socorro	LINEAR	·	4.5 km	MPC · JPL
105530	2000 RM_{27}	—	September 1, 2000	Socorro	LINEAR	EOS	3.6 km	MPC · JPL
105531	2000 RR_{28}	—	September 1, 2000	Socorro	LINEAR	·	6.2 km	MPC · JPL
105532	2000 RA_{29}	—	September 1, 2000	Socorro	LINEAR	EOS	3.4 km	MPC · JPL
105533	2000 RB_{29}	—	September 1, 2000	Socorro	LINEAR	·	3.7 km	MPC · JPL
105534	2000 RC_{29}	—	September 1, 2000	Socorro	LINEAR	·	3.3 km	MPC · JPL
105535	2000 RT_{32}	—	September 1, 2000	Socorro	LINEAR	·	7.6 km	MPC · JPL
105536	2000 RG_{37}	—	September 3, 2000	Socorro	LINEAR	H	1.3 km	MPC · JPL
105537	2000 RH_{37}	—	September 3, 2000	Socorro	LINEAR	H	1.0 km	MPC · JPL
105538	2000 RF_{39}	—	September 5, 2000	Farpoint	G. Hug	·	9.0 km	MPC · JPL
105539	2000 RJ_{39}	—	September 1, 2000	Socorro	LINEAR	TIR · slow	6.1 km	MPC · JPL
105540	2000 RH_{40}	—	September 3, 2000	Socorro	LINEAR	·	6.3 km	MPC · JPL
105541	2000 RL_{40}	—	September 3, 2000	Socorro	LINEAR	·	7.0 km	MPC · JPL
105542	2000 RR_{40}	—	September 3, 2000	Socorro	LINEAR	EOS	4.5 km	MPC · JPL
105543	2000 RW_{40}	—	September 3, 2000	Socorro	LINEAR	EOS	4.3 km	MPC · JPL
105544	2000 RC_{41}	—	September 3, 2000	Socorro	LINEAR	·	2.5 km	MPC · JPL
105545	2000 RY_{41}	—	September 3, 2000	Socorro	LINEAR	EOS	3.6 km	MPC · JPL
105546	2000 RM_{44}	—	September 3, 2000	Socorro	LINEAR	H	1.1 km	MPC · JPL
105547	2000 RX_{44}	—	September 3, 2000	Socorro	LINEAR	·	6.2 km	MPC · JPL
105548	2000 RF_{45}	—	September 3, 2000	Socorro	LINEAR	·	8.9 km	MPC · JPL
105549	2000 RJ_{45}	—	September 3, 2000	Socorro	LINEAR	BRA	3.6 km	MPC · JPL
105550	2000 RY_{45}	—	September 3, 2000	Socorro	LINEAR	·	4.4 km	MPC · JPL
105551	2000 RW_{46}	—	September 3, 2000	Socorro	LINEAR	·	2.4 km	MPC · JPL
105552	2000 RR_{49}	—	September 5, 2000	Socorro	LINEAR	EUP	8.1 km	MPC · JPL
105553	2000 RA_{50}	—	September 5, 2000	Socorro	LINEAR	·	15 km	MPC · JPL
105554	2000 RJ_{53}	—	September 5, 2000	Višnjan Observatory	K. Korlević	·	7.7 km	MPC · JPL
105555	2000 RK_{53}	—	September 5, 2000	Višnjan Observatory	K. Korlević	fast	4.5 km	MPC · JPL
105556	2000 RU_{53}	—	September 3, 2000	Socorro	LINEAR	H	870 m	MPC · JPL
105557	2000 RZ_{53}	—	September 1, 2000	Socorro	LINEAR	·	6.7 km	MPC · JPL
105558	2000 RK_{54}	—	September 3, 2000	Socorro	LINEAR	EOS	4.7 km	MPC · JPL
105559	2000 RN_{54}	—	September 3, 2000	Socorro	LINEAR	EOS	4.7 km	MPC · JPL
105560	2000 RA_{56}	—	September 5, 2000	Socorro	LINEAR	KOR	2.7 km	MPC · JPL
105561	2000 RB_{56}	—	September 5, 2000	Socorro	LINEAR	·	5.7 km	MPC · JPL
105562	2000 RS_{57}	—	September 7, 2000	Kitt Peak	Spacewatch	·	1.8 km	MPC · JPL
105563	2000 RY_{58}	—	September 7, 2000	Kitt Peak	Spacewatch	·	1.4 km	MPC · JPL
105564	2000 RR_{60}	—	September 3, 2000	Socorro	LINEAR	·	11 km	MPC · JPL
105565	2000 RA_{61}	—	September 1, 2000	Socorro	LINEAR	·	5.4 km	MPC · JPL
105566	2000 RQ_{63}	—	September 3, 2000	Socorro	LINEAR	·	5.3 km	MPC · JPL
105567	2000 RG_{64}	—	September 1, 2000	Socorro	LINEAR	·	7.7 km	MPC · JPL
105568	2000 RN_{64}	—	September 1, 2000	Socorro	LINEAR	KOR	2.9 km	MPC · JPL
105569	2000 RB_{65}	—	September 1, 2000	Socorro	LINEAR	BRA	2.7 km	MPC · JPL
105570	2000 RP_{66}	—	September 1, 2000	Socorro	LINEAR	·	2.2 km	MPC · JPL
105571	2000 RT_{67}	—	September 1, 2000	Socorro	LINEAR	·	2.1 km	MPC · JPL
105572	2000 RQ_{68}	—	September 2, 2000	Socorro	LINEAR	·	3.4 km	MPC · JPL
105573	2000 RF_{70}	—	September 2, 2000	Socorro	LINEAR	·	7.4 km	MPC · JPL
105574	2000 RZ_{70}	—	September 2, 2000	Socorro	LINEAR	·	4.2 km	MPC · JPL
105575	2000 RJ_{71}	—	September 2, 2000	Socorro	LINEAR	·	2.1 km	MPC · JPL
105576	2000 RM_{72}	—	September 2, 2000	Socorro	LINEAR	·	5.3 km	MPC · JPL
105577	2000 RP_{74}	—	September 3, 2000	Socorro	LINEAR	SYL · CYB	7.6 km	MPC · JPL
105578	2000 RE_{75}	—	September 3, 2000	Socorro	LINEAR	·	1.4 km	MPC · JPL
105579	2000 RE_{77}	—	September 8, 2000	Višnjan Observatory	K. Korlević	·	1.5 km	MPC · JPL
105580	2000 RN_{78}	—	September 8, 2000	Kitt Peak	Spacewatch	EOS	2.9 km	MPC · JPL
105581	2000 RW_{80}	—	September 1, 2000	Socorro	LINEAR	EOS	4.5 km	MPC · JPL
105582	2000 RC_{82}	—	September 1, 2000	Socorro	LINEAR	·	4.7 km	MPC · JPL
105583	2000 RU_{82}	—	September 1, 2000	Socorro	LINEAR	(5651)	11 km	MPC · JPL
105584	2000 RV_{82}	—	September 1, 2000	Socorro	LINEAR	EOS	3.7 km	MPC · JPL
105585	2000 RM_{83}	—	September 1, 2000	Socorro	LINEAR	·	7.4 km	MPC · JPL
105586	2000 RB_{85}	—	September 2, 2000	Anderson Mesa	LONEOS	THM	8.7 km	MPC · JPL
105587	2000 RM_{85}	—	September 2, 2000	Anderson Mesa	LONEOS	·	4.6 km	MPC · JPL
105588	2000 RT_{85}	—	September 2, 2000	Socorro	LINEAR	·	5.1 km	MPC · JPL
105589	2000 RV_{85}	—	September 2, 2000	Socorro	LINEAR	·	2.9 km	MPC · JPL
105590	2000 RJ_{86}	—	September 2, 2000	Socorro	LINEAR	EOS	3.7 km	MPC · JPL
105591	2000 RL_{86}	—	September 2, 2000	Anderson Mesa	LONEOS	·	4.2 km	MPC · JPL
105592	2000 RK_{88}	—	September 3, 2000	Socorro	LINEAR	NAE	4.3 km	MPC · JPL
105593	2000 RN_{88}	—	September 3, 2000	Socorro	LINEAR	·	6.1 km	MPC · JPL
105594	2000 RU_{88}	—	September 3, 2000	Socorro	LINEAR	EOS	3.8 km	MPC · JPL
105595	2000 RK_{89}	—	September 3, 2000	Socorro	LINEAR	V	1.3 km	MPC · JPL
105596	2000 RO_{89}	—	September 3, 2000	Socorro	LINEAR	GEF	3.0 km	MPC · JPL
105597	2000 RA_{91}	—	September 3, 2000	Socorro	LINEAR	·	6.1 km	MPC · JPL
105598	2000 RD_{91}	—	September 3, 2000	Socorro	LINEAR	·	9.9 km	MPC · JPL
105599	2000 RL_{91}	—	September 3, 2000	Socorro	LINEAR	·	1.3 km	MPC · JPL
105600	2000 RT_{91}	—	September 3, 2000	Socorro	LINEAR	·	1.7 km	MPC · JPL

== 105601–105700 ==
back to top

Designation			Discovery			Properties		Ref
Permanent	Provisional	Named after	Date	Site	Discoverer(s)	Category	Diam.	Ref
105601	2000 RZ_{91}	—	September 3, 2000	Socorro	LINEAR	·	5.2 km	MPC · JPL
105602	2000 RL_{93}	—	September 4, 2000	Anderson Mesa	LONEOS	HNS	2.7 km	MPC · JPL
105603	2000 RS_{93}	—	September 4, 2000	Anderson Mesa	LONEOS	·	3.6 km	MPC · JPL
105604	2000 RR_{94}	—	September 4, 2000	Anderson Mesa	LONEOS	·	6.9 km	MPC · JPL
105605	2000 RJ_{95}	—	September 4, 2000	Anderson Mesa	LONEOS	·	1.5 km	MPC · JPL
105606	2000 RV_{95}	—	September 4, 2000	Anderson Mesa	LONEOS	·	5.0 km	MPC · JPL
105607	2000 RY_{95}	—	September 4, 2000	Anderson Mesa	LONEOS	·	1.2 km	MPC · JPL
105608	2000 RY_{96}	—	September 5, 2000	Anderson Mesa	LONEOS	·	4.7 km	MPC · JPL
105609	2000 RB_{98}	—	September 5, 2000	Anderson Mesa	LONEOS	·	3.6 km	MPC · JPL
105610	2000 RG_{98}	—	September 5, 2000	Anderson Mesa	LONEOS	·	5.4 km	MPC · JPL
105611	2000 RL_{98}	—	September 5, 2000	Anderson Mesa	LONEOS	·	5.4 km	MPC · JPL
105612	2000 RT_{99}	—	September 5, 2000	Anderson Mesa	LONEOS	EOS	5.5 km	MPC · JPL
105613 Odedaharonson	2000 RX_{100}	Odedaharonson	September 5, 2000	Anderson Mesa	LONEOS	H	1.3 km	MPC · JPL
105614	2000 RT_{101}	—	September 5, 2000	Anderson Mesa	LONEOS	·	6.7 km	MPC · JPL
105615	2000 RX_{101}	—	September 5, 2000	Anderson Mesa	LONEOS	NAE	6.7 km	MPC · JPL
105616	2000 RF_{102}	—	September 5, 2000	Anderson Mesa	LONEOS	LIX	9.2 km	MPC · JPL
105617	2000 RJ_{102}	—	September 5, 2000	Anderson Mesa	LONEOS	·	6.3 km	MPC · JPL
105618	2000 RX_{102}	—	September 5, 2000	Anderson Mesa	LONEOS	·	8.8 km	MPC · JPL
105619	2000 RA_{104}	—	September 6, 2000	Socorro	LINEAR	·	5.9 km	MPC · JPL
105620	2000 RE_{104}	—	September 6, 2000	Socorro	LINEAR	·	4.7 km	MPC · JPL
105621	2000 RG_{105}	—	September 7, 2000	Socorro	LINEAR	H	1.4 km	MPC · JPL
105622	2000 RK_{105}	—	September 7, 2000	Socorro	LINEAR	·	3.9 km	MPC · JPL
105623	2000 SN_{1}	—	September 18, 2000	Socorro	LINEAR	H	1.9 km	MPC · JPL
105624	2000 ST_{3}	—	September 20, 2000	Socorro	LINEAR	·	4.1 km	MPC · JPL
105625	2000 SG_{4}	—	September 21, 2000	Haleakala	NEAT	·	1.2 km	MPC · JPL
105626	2000 SW_{4}	—	September 20, 2000	Socorro	LINEAR	H	900 m	MPC · JPL
105627	2000 SY_{4}	—	September 20, 2000	Socorro	LINEAR	T_{j} (2.95)	9.0 km	MPC · JPL
105628	2000 SG_{5}	—	September 22, 2000	Socorro	LINEAR	H	910 m	MPC · JPL
105629	2000 SS_{5}	—	September 22, 2000	Socorro	LINEAR	·	5.1 km	MPC · JPL
105630	2000 SZ_{5}	—	September 20, 2000	Socorro	LINEAR	·	9.4 km	MPC · JPL
105631	2000 SU_{7}	—	September 22, 2000	Kitt Peak	Spacewatch	·	1.3 km	MPC · JPL
105632	2000 SQ_{8}	—	September 22, 2000	Prescott	P. G. Comba	·	2.7 km	MPC · JPL
105633	2000 SZ_{9}	—	September 23, 2000	Socorro	LINEAR	H	1.3 km	MPC · JPL
105634	2000 SX_{12}	—	September 21, 2000	Socorro	LINEAR	·	2.8 km	MPC · JPL
105635	2000 SN_{13}	—	September 21, 2000	Socorro	LINEAR	·	2.3 km	MPC · JPL
105636	2000 ST_{13}	—	September 21, 2000	Socorro	LINEAR	·	6.1 km	MPC · JPL
105637	2000 SC_{14}	—	September 23, 2000	Socorro	LINEAR	ERI	3.3 km	MPC · JPL
105638	2000 SK_{14}	—	September 23, 2000	Socorro	LINEAR	·	6.8 km	MPC · JPL
105639	2000 SL_{15}	—	September 23, 2000	Socorro	LINEAR	·	3.9 km	MPC · JPL
105640	2000 SP_{15}	—	September 23, 2000	Socorro	LINEAR	·	1.5 km	MPC · JPL
105641	2000 SH_{17}	—	September 23, 2000	Socorro	LINEAR	·	6.1 km	MPC · JPL
105642	2000 SJ_{17}	—	September 23, 2000	Socorro	LINEAR	·	4.3 km	MPC · JPL
105643	2000 SF_{18}	—	September 23, 2000	Socorro	LINEAR	·	4.5 km	MPC · JPL
105644	2000 SY_{19}	—	September 23, 2000	Socorro	LINEAR	EOS	4.7 km	MPC · JPL
105645	2000 SQ_{20}	—	September 23, 2000	Socorro	LINEAR	·	4.5 km	MPC · JPL
105646	2000 SL_{21}	—	September 24, 2000	Socorro	LINEAR	·	1.5 km	MPC · JPL
105647	2000 SL_{22}	—	September 20, 2000	Haleakala	NEAT	·	4.7 km	MPC · JPL
105648	2000 SA_{23}	—	September 25, 2000	Višnjan Observatory	K. Korlević	NYS	1.5 km	MPC · JPL
105649	2000 SQ_{23}	—	September 20, 2000	Cordell-Lorenz	D. T. Durig, McDermott, A. D.	T_{j} (2.99)	11 km	MPC · JPL
105650	2000 SU_{23}	—	September 22, 2000	Socorro	LINEAR	H	920 m	MPC · JPL
105651	2000 SF_{24}	—	September 24, 2000	Socorro	LINEAR	H	1.2 km	MPC · JPL
105652	2000 SU_{24}	—	September 26, 2000	Bisei SG Center	BATTeRS	EOS	3.9 km	MPC · JPL
105653	2000 SA_{26}	—	September 23, 2000	Socorro	LINEAR	EOS	3.8 km	MPC · JPL
105654	2000 SX_{26}	—	September 23, 2000	Socorro	LINEAR	L5 · slow	10 km	MPC · JPL
105655	2000 ST_{27}	—	September 23, 2000	Socorro	LINEAR	·	5.3 km	MPC · JPL
105656	2000 SA_{28}	—	September 23, 2000	Socorro	LINEAR	·	6.4 km	MPC · JPL
105657	2000 SL_{28}	—	September 23, 2000	Socorro	LINEAR	slow	5.9 km	MPC · JPL
105658	2000 SF_{29}	—	September 24, 2000	Socorro	LINEAR	·	5.3 km	MPC · JPL
105659	2000 SV_{31}	—	September 24, 2000	Socorro	LINEAR	KOR	2.4 km	MPC · JPL
105660	2000 SG_{32}	—	September 24, 2000	Socorro	LINEAR	·	2.9 km	MPC · JPL
105661	2000 SO_{32}	—	September 24, 2000	Socorro	LINEAR	·	3.0 km	MPC · JPL
105662	2000 SN_{36}	—	September 24, 2000	Socorro	LINEAR	·	4.4 km	MPC · JPL
105663	2000 SZ_{36}	—	September 24, 2000	Socorro	LINEAR	HYG	5.5 km	MPC · JPL
105664	2000 SL_{37}	—	September 24, 2000	Socorro	LINEAR	·	2.0 km	MPC · JPL
105665	2000 SQ_{37}	—	September 24, 2000	Socorro	LINEAR	·	7.3 km	MPC · JPL
105666	2000 SS_{37}	—	September 24, 2000	Socorro	LINEAR	EOS	3.5 km	MPC · JPL
105667	2000 SO_{38}	—	September 24, 2000	Socorro	LINEAR	·	4.9 km	MPC · JPL
105668	2000 SW_{38}	—	September 24, 2000	Socorro	LINEAR	·	2.2 km	MPC · JPL
105669	2000 SW_{39}	—	September 24, 2000	Socorro	LINEAR	·	1.6 km	MPC · JPL
105670	2000 SK_{40}	—	September 24, 2000	Socorro	LINEAR	·	7.0 km	MPC · JPL
105671	2000 SM_{40}	—	September 24, 2000	Socorro	LINEAR	·	2.6 km	MPC · JPL
105672	2000 SX_{40}	—	September 24, 2000	Socorro	LINEAR	KOR	2.8 km	MPC · JPL
105673	2000 SL_{42}	—	September 26, 2000	Višnjan Observatory	K. Korlević	·	6.9 km	MPC · JPL
105674	2000 SQ_{42}	—	September 25, 2000	Anderson Mesa	LONEOS	·	1.9 km	MPC · JPL
105675 Kamiukena	2000 ST_{42}	Kamiukena	September 26, 2000	Kuma Kogen	A. Nakamura	KOR	2.5 km	MPC · JPL
105676	2000 SM_{43}	—	September 23, 2000	Bergisch Gladbach	W. Bickel	·	1.6 km	MPC · JPL
105677	2000 SN_{43}	—	September 23, 2000	Bergisch Gladbach	W. Bickel	EOS	3.4 km	MPC · JPL
105678	2000 SM_{46}	—	September 23, 2000	Socorro	LINEAR	·	5.6 km	MPC · JPL
105679	2000 SO_{46}	—	September 23, 2000	Socorro	LINEAR	·	4.4 km	MPC · JPL
105680	2000 SP_{46}	—	September 23, 2000	Socorro	LINEAR	EUN	3.6 km	MPC · JPL
105681	2000 SR_{46}	—	September 23, 2000	Socorro	LINEAR	·	9.0 km	MPC · JPL
105682	2000 SD_{47}	—	September 23, 2000	Socorro	LINEAR	·	4.4 km	MPC · JPL
105683	2000 SF_{48}	—	September 23, 2000	Socorro	LINEAR	·	4.6 km	MPC · JPL
105684	2000 SV_{48}	—	September 23, 2000	Socorro	LINEAR	·	1.2 km	MPC · JPL
105685	2000 SC_{51}	—	September 23, 2000	Socorro	LINEAR	L5	19 km	MPC · JPL
105686	2000 SG_{52}	—	September 23, 2000	Socorro	LINEAR	(1298)	6.2 km	MPC · JPL
105687	2000 SS_{55}	—	September 24, 2000	Socorro	LINEAR	·	5.8 km	MPC · JPL
105688	2000 SG_{57}	—	September 24, 2000	Socorro	LINEAR	·	1.6 km	MPC · JPL
105689	2000 SX_{57}	—	September 24, 2000	Socorro	LINEAR	EOS	3.7 km	MPC · JPL
105690	2000 SA_{58}	—	September 24, 2000	Socorro	LINEAR	·	3.3 km	MPC · JPL
105691	2000 SK_{60}	—	September 24, 2000	Socorro	LINEAR	THM	6.5 km	MPC · JPL
105692	2000 SL_{62}	—	September 24, 2000	Socorro	LINEAR	THM	7.0 km	MPC · JPL
105693	2000 SU_{62}	—	September 24, 2000	Socorro	LINEAR	·	4.4 km	MPC · JPL
105694	2000 SV_{62}	—	September 24, 2000	Socorro	LINEAR	L5	23 km	MPC · JPL
105695	2000 SC_{63}	—	September 24, 2000	Socorro	LINEAR	·	2.2 km	MPC · JPL
105696	2000 SJ_{63}	—	September 24, 2000	Socorro	LINEAR	·	2.9 km	MPC · JPL
105697	2000 SV_{64}	—	September 24, 2000	Socorro	LINEAR	·	1.4 km	MPC · JPL
105698	2000 SX_{64}	—	September 24, 2000	Socorro	LINEAR	·	7.6 km	MPC · JPL
105699	2000 SH_{66}	—	September 24, 2000	Socorro	LINEAR	MAS	2.1 km	MPC · JPL
105700	2000 SK_{67}	—	September 24, 2000	Socorro	LINEAR	·	2.0 km	MPC · JPL

== 105701–105800 ==
back to top

Designation			Discovery			Properties		Ref
Permanent	Provisional	Named after	Date	Site	Discoverer(s)	Category	Diam.	Ref
105701	2000 SS_{67}	—	September 24, 2000	Socorro	LINEAR	EOS	3.4 km	MPC · JPL
105702	2000 SB_{68}	—	September 24, 2000	Socorro	LINEAR	·	2.1 km	MPC · JPL
105703	2000 SV_{68}	—	September 24, 2000	Socorro	LINEAR	KOR	2.6 km	MPC · JPL
105704	2000 SF_{69}	—	September 24, 2000	Socorro	LINEAR	·	3.5 km	MPC · JPL
105705	2000 SO_{69}	—	September 24, 2000	Socorro	LINEAR	·	6.5 km	MPC · JPL
105706	2000 SR_{69}	—	September 24, 2000	Socorro	LINEAR	·	5.3 km	MPC · JPL
105707	2000 SL_{70}	—	September 24, 2000	Socorro	LINEAR	HYG	5.7 km	MPC · JPL
105708	2000 SB_{71}	—	September 24, 2000	Socorro	LINEAR	THM	4.6 km	MPC · JPL
105709	2000 SH_{71}	—	September 24, 2000	Socorro	LINEAR	·	2.5 km	MPC · JPL
105710	2000 SA_{72}	—	September 24, 2000	Socorro	LINEAR	·	6.4 km	MPC · JPL
105711	2000 SO_{73}	—	September 24, 2000	Socorro	LINEAR	·	5.1 km	MPC · JPL
105712	2000 SO_{74}	—	September 24, 2000	Socorro	LINEAR	·	2.3 km	MPC · JPL
105713	2000 SR_{74}	—	September 24, 2000	Socorro	LINEAR	·	12 km	MPC · JPL
105714	2000 SP_{75}	—	September 24, 2000	Socorro	LINEAR	HYG	5.3 km	MPC · JPL
105715	2000 SQ_{75}	—	September 24, 2000	Socorro	LINEAR	·	3.7 km	MPC · JPL
105716	2000 SZ_{75}	—	September 24, 2000	Socorro	LINEAR	·	9.6 km	MPC · JPL
105717	2000 SM_{76}	—	September 24, 2000	Socorro	LINEAR	·	2.1 km	MPC · JPL
105718	2000 SN_{77}	—	September 24, 2000	Socorro	LINEAR	·	2.8 km	MPC · JPL
105719	2000 SO_{77}	—	September 24, 2000	Socorro	LINEAR	KOR ·	2.5 km	MPC · JPL
105720	2000 SR_{79}	—	September 24, 2000	Socorro	LINEAR	L5	17 km	MPC · JPL
105721	2000 ST_{79}	—	September 24, 2000	Socorro	LINEAR	(2076)	1.7 km	MPC · JPL
105722	2000 SF_{80}	—	September 24, 2000	Socorro	LINEAR	·	2.0 km	MPC · JPL
105723	2000 SH_{81}	—	September 24, 2000	Socorro	LINEAR	·	2.6 km	MPC · JPL
105724	2000 SN_{81}	—	September 24, 2000	Socorro	LINEAR	·	2.3 km	MPC · JPL
105725	2000 SS_{81}	—	September 24, 2000	Socorro	LINEAR	·	8.6 km	MPC · JPL
105726	2000 SW_{81}	—	September 24, 2000	Socorro	LINEAR	·	3.7 km	MPC · JPL
105727	2000 SG_{82}	—	September 24, 2000	Socorro	LINEAR	·	5.3 km	MPC · JPL
105728	2000 SR_{82}	—	September 24, 2000	Socorro	LINEAR	ELF	10 km	MPC · JPL
105729	2000 SE_{83}	—	September 24, 2000	Socorro	LINEAR	·	4.8 km	MPC · JPL
105730	2000 SN_{83}	—	September 24, 2000	Socorro	LINEAR	·	6.9 km	MPC · JPL
105731	2000 SU_{83}	—	September 24, 2000	Socorro	LINEAR	NYS	1.7 km	MPC · JPL
105732	2000 SX_{83}	—	September 24, 2000	Socorro	LINEAR	EOS	4.4 km	MPC · JPL
105733	2000 SP_{84}	—	September 24, 2000	Socorro	LINEAR	·	1.7 km	MPC · JPL
105734	2000 SS_{84}	—	September 24, 2000	Socorro	LINEAR	EOS	3.5 km	MPC · JPL
105735	2000 SG_{85}	—	September 24, 2000	Socorro	LINEAR	·	2.0 km	MPC · JPL
105736	2000 SK_{86}	—	September 24, 2000	Socorro	LINEAR	·	4.8 km	MPC · JPL
105737	2000 SL_{88}	—	September 24, 2000	Socorro	LINEAR	·	1.8 km	MPC · JPL
105738	2000 SU_{88}	—	September 24, 2000	Socorro	LINEAR	·	5.8 km	MPC · JPL
105739	2000 SY_{88}	—	September 25, 2000	Socorro	LINEAR	V	1.8 km	MPC · JPL
105740	2000 SF_{89}	—	September 22, 2000	Socorro	LINEAR	·	6.6 km	MPC · JPL
105741	2000 SJ_{89}	—	September 27, 2000	Socorro	LINEAR	TIR	6.3 km	MPC · JPL
105742	2000 SH_{90}	—	September 22, 2000	Socorro	LINEAR	·	7.8 km	MPC · JPL
105743	2000 SA_{91}	—	September 22, 2000	Socorro	LINEAR	·	8.5 km	MPC · JPL
105744	2000 SR_{91}	—	September 23, 2000	Socorro	LINEAR	·	5.8 km	MPC · JPL
105745	2000 SE_{92}	—	September 23, 2000	Socorro	LINEAR	·	6.1 km	MPC · JPL
105746	2000 SP_{92}	—	September 23, 2000	Socorro	LINEAR	L5	14 km	MPC · JPL
105747	2000 SA_{93}	—	September 23, 2000	Socorro	LINEAR	·	4.8 km	MPC · JPL
105748	2000 SG_{94}	—	September 23, 2000	Socorro	LINEAR	EOS	4.2 km	MPC · JPL
105749	2000 SK_{94}	—	September 23, 2000	Socorro	LINEAR	EOS	3.8 km	MPC · JPL
105750	2000 SY_{94}	—	September 23, 2000	Socorro	LINEAR	V	1.2 km	MPC · JPL
105751	2000 SX_{95}	—	September 23, 2000	Socorro	LINEAR	·	1.3 km	MPC · JPL
105752	2000 SC_{97}	—	September 23, 2000	Socorro	LINEAR	V	1.6 km	MPC · JPL
105753	2000 SU_{97}	—	September 23, 2000	Socorro	LINEAR	·	3.2 km	MPC · JPL
105754	2000 SM_{98}	—	September 23, 2000	Socorro	LINEAR	EOS	5.4 km	MPC · JPL
105755	2000 SA_{99}	—	September 23, 2000	Socorro	LINEAR	·	1.8 km	MPC · JPL
105756	2000 SV_{99}	—	September 23, 2000	Socorro	LINEAR	·	5.5 km	MPC · JPL
105757	2000 SF_{100}	—	September 23, 2000	Socorro	LINEAR	·	8.5 km	MPC · JPL
105758	2000 SP_{100}	—	September 23, 2000	Socorro	LINEAR	·	10 km	MPC · JPL
105759	2000 SF_{101}	—	September 24, 2000	Socorro	LINEAR	·	5.6 km	MPC · JPL
105760	2000 ST_{101}	—	September 24, 2000	Socorro	LINEAR	MAS	1.5 km	MPC · JPL
105761	2000 SU_{101}	—	September 24, 2000	Socorro	LINEAR	·	2.7 km	MPC · JPL
105762	2000 SJ_{104}	—	September 24, 2000	Socorro	LINEAR	·	1.8 km	MPC · JPL
105763	2000 SV_{104}	—	September 24, 2000	Socorro	LINEAR	·	1.4 km	MPC · JPL
105764	2000 ST_{106}	—	September 24, 2000	Socorro	LINEAR	·	1.3 km	MPC · JPL
105765	2000 SX_{106}	—	September 24, 2000	Socorro	LINEAR	HYG	5.4 km	MPC · JPL
105766	2000 SB_{107}	—	September 24, 2000	Socorro	LINEAR	GEF	2.7 km	MPC · JPL
105767	2000 SE_{107}	—	September 24, 2000	Socorro	LINEAR	·	6.0 km	MPC · JPL
105768	2000 SH_{107}	—	September 24, 2000	Socorro	LINEAR	NAE	6.7 km	MPC · JPL
105769	2000 SW_{107}	—	September 24, 2000	Socorro	LINEAR	·	2.9 km	MPC · JPL
105770	2000 SA_{108}	—	September 24, 2000	Socorro	LINEAR	·	3.5 km	MPC · JPL
105771	2000 SG_{108}	—	September 24, 2000	Socorro	LINEAR	·	4.7 km	MPC · JPL
105772	2000 ST_{108}	—	September 24, 2000	Socorro	LINEAR	EMA	6.7 km	MPC · JPL
105773	2000 SC_{111}	—	September 24, 2000	Socorro	LINEAR	EOS	4.0 km	MPC · JPL
105774	2000 SX_{111}	—	September 24, 2000	Socorro	LINEAR	THM	5.0 km	MPC · JPL
105775	2000 SY_{112}	—	September 24, 2000	Socorro	LINEAR	·	1.8 km	MPC · JPL
105776	2000 SG_{113}	—	September 24, 2000	Socorro	LINEAR	·	4.9 km	MPC · JPL
105777	2000 SX_{113}	—	September 24, 2000	Socorro	LINEAR	·	7.2 km	MPC · JPL
105778	2000 SW_{114}	—	September 24, 2000	Socorro	LINEAR	NYS	2.2 km	MPC · JPL
105779	2000 SA_{115}	—	September 24, 2000	Socorro	LINEAR	·	4.8 km	MPC · JPL
105780	2000 SH_{115}	—	September 24, 2000	Socorro	LINEAR	·	2.2 km	MPC · JPL
105781	2000 SM_{115}	—	September 24, 2000	Socorro	LINEAR	·	6.0 km	MPC · JPL
105782	2000 SR_{115}	—	September 24, 2000	Socorro	LINEAR	·	4.1 km	MPC · JPL
105783	2000 SM_{118}	—	September 24, 2000	Socorro	LINEAR	·	6.1 km	MPC · JPL
105784	2000 SV_{118}	—	September 24, 2000	Socorro	LINEAR	·	6.0 km	MPC · JPL
105785	2000 SY_{119}	—	September 24, 2000	Socorro	LINEAR	(1298)	6.0 km	MPC · JPL
105786	2000 SD_{120}	—	September 24, 2000	Socorro	LINEAR	fast	1.3 km	MPC · JPL
105787	2000 SM_{120}	—	September 24, 2000	Socorro	LINEAR	·	1.6 km	MPC · JPL
105788	2000 SB_{121}	—	September 24, 2000	Socorro	LINEAR	·	8.5 km	MPC · JPL
105789	2000 SR_{121}	—	September 24, 2000	Socorro	LINEAR	·	7.2 km	MPC · JPL
105790	2000 SG_{122}	—	September 24, 2000	Socorro	LINEAR	·	1.6 km	MPC · JPL
105791	2000 SH_{122}	—	September 24, 2000	Socorro	LINEAR	·	5.0 km	MPC · JPL
105792	2000 SK_{122}	—	September 24, 2000	Socorro	LINEAR	URS ·	7.8 km	MPC · JPL
105793	2000 SN_{122}	—	September 24, 2000	Socorro	LINEAR	·	3.8 km	MPC · JPL
105794	2000 SV_{122}	—	September 24, 2000	Socorro	LINEAR	·	2.4 km	MPC · JPL
105795	2000 SA_{123}	—	September 24, 2000	Socorro	LINEAR	·	6.5 km	MPC · JPL
105796	2000 SR_{123}	—	September 24, 2000	Socorro	LINEAR	·	7.2 km	MPC · JPL
105797	2000 SD_{124}	—	September 24, 2000	Socorro	LINEAR	·	5.5 km	MPC · JPL
105798	2000 SE_{125}	—	September 24, 2000	Socorro	LINEAR	·	2.6 km	MPC · JPL
105799	2000 SV_{126}	—	September 24, 2000	Socorro	LINEAR	·	8.0 km	MPC · JPL
105800	2000 SG_{127}	—	September 24, 2000	Socorro	LINEAR	·	3.8 km	MPC · JPL

== 105801–105900 ==
back to top

Designation			Discovery			Properties		Ref
Permanent	Provisional	Named after	Date	Site	Discoverer(s)	Category	Diam.	Ref
105801	2000 SK_{128}	—	September 24, 2000	Socorro	LINEAR	·	3.9 km	MPC · JPL
105802	2000 SV_{128}	—	September 24, 2000	Socorro	LINEAR	·	3.4 km	MPC · JPL
105803	2000 SH_{132}	—	September 22, 2000	Socorro	LINEAR	L5	16 km	MPC · JPL
105804	2000 SY_{133}	—	September 23, 2000	Socorro	LINEAR	·	6.0 km	MPC · JPL
105805	2000 SL_{135}	—	September 23, 2000	Socorro	LINEAR	·	9.7 km	MPC · JPL
105806	2000 ST_{135}	—	September 23, 2000	Socorro	LINEAR	·	4.1 km	MPC · JPL
105807	2000 SY_{135}	—	September 23, 2000	Socorro	LINEAR	TIR	5.2 km	MPC · JPL
105808	2000 SZ_{135}	—	September 23, 2000	Socorro	LINEAR	L5	24 km	MPC · JPL
105809	2000 SJ_{136}	—	September 23, 2000	Socorro	LINEAR	·	4.8 km	MPC · JPL
105810	2000 SR_{138}	—	September 23, 2000	Socorro	LINEAR	·	3.6 km	MPC · JPL
105811	2000 SY_{138}	—	September 23, 2000	Socorro	LINEAR	EOS	4.3 km	MPC · JPL
105812	2000 SZ_{138}	—	September 23, 2000	Socorro	LINEAR	·	2.2 km	MPC · JPL
105813	2000 ST_{140}	—	September 23, 2000	Socorro	LINEAR	AGN	3.2 km	MPC · JPL
105814	2000 SW_{140}	—	September 23, 2000	Socorro	LINEAR	·	5.5 km	MPC · JPL
105815	2000 SB_{141}	—	September 23, 2000	Socorro	LINEAR	·	1.9 km	MPC · JPL
105816	2000 SJ_{141}	—	September 23, 2000	Socorro	LINEAR	·	1.8 km	MPC · JPL
105817	2000 SC_{142}	—	September 23, 2000	Socorro	LINEAR	·	4.1 km	MPC · JPL
105818	2000 SM_{142}	—	September 23, 2000	Socorro	LINEAR	HYG	7.2 km	MPC · JPL
105819	2000 SN_{142}	—	September 23, 2000	Socorro	LINEAR	·	6.2 km	MPC · JPL
105820	2000 SP_{142}	—	September 23, 2000	Socorro	LINEAR	EOS	5.3 km	MPC · JPL
105821	2000 SQ_{142}	—	September 23, 2000	Socorro	LINEAR	EUP	10 km	MPC · JPL
105822	2000 SZ_{142}	—	September 23, 2000	Socorro	LINEAR	·	3.6 km	MPC · JPL
105823	2000 SF_{143}	—	September 23, 2000	Socorro	LINEAR	(5651)	7.4 km	MPC · JPL
105824	2000 SW_{143}	—	September 24, 2000	Socorro	LINEAR	THM	4.0 km	MPC · JPL
105825	2000 SG_{144}	—	September 24, 2000	Socorro	LINEAR	·	2.4 km	MPC · JPL
105826	2000 SD_{145}	—	September 24, 2000	Socorro	LINEAR	·	5.0 km	MPC · JPL
105827	2000 SM_{146}	—	September 24, 2000	Socorro	LINEAR	·	2.8 km	MPC · JPL
105828	2000 SR_{146}	—	September 24, 2000	Socorro	LINEAR	EOS	4.6 km	MPC · JPL
105829	2000 SH_{147}	—	September 24, 2000	Socorro	LINEAR	·	3.6 km	MPC · JPL
105830	2000 SC_{148}	—	September 24, 2000	Socorro	LINEAR	·	1.1 km	MPC · JPL
105831	2000 SD_{148}	—	September 24, 2000	Socorro	LINEAR	EOS	5.6 km	MPC · JPL
105832	2000 SM_{148}	—	September 24, 2000	Socorro	LINEAR	·	2.3 km	MPC · JPL
105833	2000 SA_{150}	—	September 24, 2000	Socorro	LINEAR	·	2.8 km	MPC · JPL
105834	2000 SC_{150}	—	September 24, 2000	Socorro	LINEAR	·	7.1 km	MPC · JPL
105835	2000 SW_{150}	—	September 24, 2000	Socorro	LINEAR	HYG	6.7 km	MPC · JPL
105836	2000 SJ_{152}	—	September 24, 2000	Socorro	LINEAR	EOS	4.9 km	MPC · JPL
105837	2000 ST_{152}	—	September 24, 2000	Socorro	LINEAR	·	2.8 km	MPC · JPL
105838	2000 SZ_{152}	—	September 24, 2000	Socorro	LINEAR	THM	4.2 km	MPC · JPL
105839	2000 SC_{154}	—	September 24, 2000	Socorro	LINEAR	·	4.5 km	MPC · JPL
105840	2000 SK_{155}	—	September 24, 2000	Socorro	LINEAR	·	7.0 km	MPC · JPL
105841	2000 ST_{155}	—	September 24, 2000	Socorro	LINEAR	·	1.1 km	MPC · JPL
105842	2000 SJ_{156}	—	September 24, 2000	Socorro	LINEAR	THM	5.8 km	MPC · JPL
105843	2000 SD_{160}	—	September 22, 2000	Socorro	LINEAR	H	1.2 km	MPC · JPL
105844	2000 SH_{160}	—	September 27, 2000	Socorro	LINEAR	H	1.1 km	MPC · JPL
105845	2000 SB_{163}	—	September 27, 2000	Bisei SG Center	BATTeRS	·	2.4 km	MPC · JPL
105846	2000 SK_{164}	—	September 25, 2000	Socorro	LINEAR	H	1.3 km	MPC · JPL
105847	2000 SD_{165}	—	September 23, 2000	Socorro	LINEAR	·	4.5 km	MPC · JPL
105848	2000 SK_{165}	—	September 23, 2000	Socorro	LINEAR	·	6.4 km	MPC · JPL
105849	2000 SL_{165}	—	September 23, 2000	Socorro	LINEAR	EOS ·	4.4 km	MPC · JPL
105850	2000 SN_{165}	—	September 23, 2000	Socorro	LINEAR	·	6.5 km	MPC · JPL
105851	2000 ST_{165}	—	September 23, 2000	Socorro	LINEAR	·	6.7 km	MPC · JPL
105852	2000 SV_{165}	—	September 23, 2000	Socorro	LINEAR	·	6.2 km	MPC · JPL
105853	2000 SY_{165}	—	September 23, 2000	Socorro	LINEAR	·	6.0 km	MPC · JPL
105854	2000 SB_{167}	—	September 23, 2000	Socorro	LINEAR	VER	6.9 km	MPC · JPL
105855	2000 SD_{167}	—	September 23, 2000	Socorro	LINEAR	·	3.9 km	MPC · JPL
105856	2000 SH_{167}	—	September 23, 2000	Socorro	LINEAR	·	7.8 km	MPC · JPL
105857	2000 SZ_{167}	—	September 23, 2000	Socorro	LINEAR	·	7.0 km	MPC · JPL
105858	2000 SW_{169}	—	September 24, 2000	Socorro	LINEAR	PHO	1.9 km	MPC · JPL
105859	2000 SY_{169}	—	September 24, 2000	Socorro	LINEAR	LIX	7.1 km	MPC · JPL
105860	2000 SJ_{170}	—	September 24, 2000	Socorro	LINEAR	·	4.9 km	MPC · JPL
105861	2000 SP_{170}	—	September 24, 2000	Socorro	LINEAR	HYG	5.7 km	MPC · JPL
105862	2000 SU_{170}	—	September 24, 2000	Socorro	LINEAR	EOS	4.1 km	MPC · JPL
105863	2000 SZ_{170}	—	September 24, 2000	Socorro	LINEAR	·	1.5 km	MPC · JPL
105864	2000 SC_{171}	—	September 24, 2000	Socorro	LINEAR	LIX	6.8 km	MPC · JPL
105865	2000 SE_{171}	—	September 24, 2000	Socorro	LINEAR	·	5.5 km	MPC · JPL
105866	2000 SH_{171}	—	September 24, 2000	Socorro	LINEAR	·	5.8 km	MPC · JPL
105867	2000 ST_{171}	—	September 26, 2000	Socorro	LINEAR	·	8.0 km	MPC · JPL
105868	2000 SC_{173}	—	September 28, 2000	Socorro	LINEAR	·	5.8 km	MPC · JPL
105869	2000 SJ_{173}	—	September 28, 2000	Socorro	LINEAR	·	11 km	MPC · JPL
105870	2000 ST_{173}	—	September 28, 2000	Socorro	LINEAR	·	4.0 km	MPC · JPL
105871	2000 SK_{174}	—	September 28, 2000	Socorro	LINEAR	·	3.4 km	MPC · JPL
105872	2000 SZ_{174}	—	September 28, 2000	Socorro	LINEAR	·	2.2 km	MPC · JPL
105873	2000 SB_{176}	—	September 28, 2000	Socorro	LINEAR	EOS	4.6 km	MPC · JPL
105874	2000 SF_{176}	—	September 28, 2000	Socorro	LINEAR	V	1.2 km	MPC · JPL
105875	2000 SD_{177}	—	September 28, 2000	Socorro	LINEAR	·	6.8 km	MPC · JPL
105876	2000 SF_{177}	—	September 28, 2000	Socorro	LINEAR	·	9.0 km	MPC · JPL
105877	2000 SJ_{177}	—	September 28, 2000	Socorro	LINEAR	·	4.6 km	MPC · JPL
105878	2000 SP_{177}	—	September 28, 2000	Socorro	LINEAR	·	2.0 km	MPC · JPL
105879	2000 SQ_{177}	—	September 28, 2000	Socorro	LINEAR	EOS	4.5 km	MPC · JPL
105880	2000 SW_{177}	—	September 28, 2000	Socorro	LINEAR	H	980 m	MPC · JPL
105881	2000 SZ_{178}	—	September 28, 2000	Socorro	LINEAR	·	5.5 km	MPC · JPL
105882	2000 SL_{179}	—	September 28, 2000	Socorro	LINEAR	EOS	4.8 km	MPC · JPL
105883	2000 SY_{179}	—	September 28, 2000	Socorro	LINEAR	·	1.4 km	MPC · JPL
105884	2000 SB_{180}	—	September 28, 2000	Socorro	LINEAR	EOS	3.7 km	MPC · JPL
105885	2000 SW_{180}	—	September 17, 2000	Kvistaberg	Uppsala-DLR Asteroid Survey	·	5.4 km	MPC · JPL
105886	2000 SP_{181}	—	September 19, 2000	Haleakala	NEAT	·	2.8 km	MPC · JPL
105887	2000 SM_{182}	—	September 20, 2000	Socorro	LINEAR	·	4.4 km	MPC · JPL
105888	2000 SP_{182}	—	September 20, 2000	Kitt Peak	Spacewatch	·	5.5 km	MPC · JPL
105889	2000 SU_{182}	—	September 20, 2000	Kitt Peak	Spacewatch	·	1.3 km	MPC · JPL
105890	2000 SB_{183}	—	September 20, 2000	Kitt Peak	Spacewatch	KOR	3.4 km	MPC · JPL
105891	2000 SF_{183}	—	September 20, 2000	Kitt Peak	Spacewatch	·	2.6 km	MPC · JPL
105892	2000 SO_{183}	—	September 20, 2000	Haleakala	NEAT	·	1.3 km	MPC · JPL
105893	2000 SD_{184}	—	September 20, 2000	Kitt Peak	Spacewatch	·	5.6 km	MPC · JPL
105894	2000 SE_{185}	—	September 20, 2000	Haleakala	NEAT	·	2.9 km	MPC · JPL
105895	2000 SE_{187}	—	September 21, 2000	Haleakala	NEAT	·	5.5 km	MPC · JPL
105896	2000 SG_{187}	—	September 21, 2000	Haleakala	NEAT	L5	14 km	MPC · JPL
105897	2000 ST_{187}	—	September 21, 2000	Haleakala	NEAT	TEL	3.7 km	MPC · JPL
105898	2000 SC_{188}	—	September 21, 2000	Haleakala	NEAT	KOR	2.8 km	MPC · JPL
105899	2000 SH_{189}	—	September 22, 2000	Kitt Peak	Spacewatch	·	6.3 km	MPC · JPL
105900	2000 SJ_{190}	—	September 23, 2000	Socorro	LINEAR	·	2.4 km	MPC · JPL

== 105901–106000 ==
back to top

Designation			Discovery			Properties		Ref
Permanent	Provisional	Named after	Date	Site	Discoverer(s)	Category	Diam.	Ref
105901	2000 SG_{192}	—	September 24, 2000	Socorro	LINEAR	L5	16 km	MPC · JPL
105902	2000 SQ_{192}	—	September 24, 2000	Kitt Peak	Spacewatch	NYS	1.9 km	MPC · JPL
105903	2000 SJ_{196}	—	September 24, 2000	Socorro	LINEAR	AST	2.9 km	MPC · JPL
105904	2000 SB_{197}	—	September 24, 2000	Socorro	LINEAR	L5	13 km	MPC · JPL
105905	2000 SL_{199}	—	September 24, 2000	Socorro	LINEAR	·	3.3 km	MPC · JPL
105906	2000 SA_{200}	—	September 24, 2000	Socorro	LINEAR	EOS ·	3.1 km	MPC · JPL
105907	2000 SN_{200}	—	September 24, 2000	Socorro	LINEAR	·	4.4 km	MPC · JPL
105908	2000 SO_{200}	—	September 24, 2000	Socorro	LINEAR	·	4.1 km	MPC · JPL
105909	2000 SZ_{201}	—	September 24, 2000	Socorro	LINEAR	·	2.8 km	MPC · JPL
105910	2000 SY_{202}	—	September 24, 2000	Socorro	LINEAR	·	3.2 km	MPC · JPL
105911	2000 SB_{205}	—	September 24, 2000	Socorro	LINEAR	·	5.7 km	MPC · JPL
105912	2000 SD_{205}	—	September 24, 2000	Socorro	LINEAR	·	6.8 km	MPC · JPL
105913	2000 SF_{205}	—	September 24, 2000	Socorro	LINEAR	HYG	5.4 km	MPC · JPL
105914	2000 ST_{205}	—	September 24, 2000	Socorro	LINEAR	·	3.4 km	MPC · JPL
105915	2000 SU_{205}	—	September 24, 2000	Socorro	LINEAR	·	3.5 km	MPC · JPL
105916	2000 SJ_{207}	—	September 24, 2000	Socorro	LINEAR	·	3.8 km	MPC · JPL
105917	2000 SW_{207}	—	September 24, 2000	Socorro	LINEAR	·	5.5 km	MPC · JPL
105918	2000 SS_{208}	—	September 25, 2000	Socorro	LINEAR	·	1.2 km	MPC · JPL
105919	2000 SR_{209}	—	September 25, 2000	Socorro	LINEAR	·	7.7 km	MPC · JPL
105920	2000 SX_{209}	—	September 25, 2000	Socorro	LINEAR	·	3.1 km	MPC · JPL
105921	2000 SA_{210}	—	September 25, 2000	Socorro	LINEAR	·	7.8 km	MPC · JPL
105922	2000 SB_{210}	—	September 25, 2000	Socorro	LINEAR	·	5.1 km	MPC · JPL
105923	2000 SX_{210}	—	September 25, 2000	Socorro	LINEAR	·	4.7 km	MPC · JPL
105924	2000 SH_{211}	—	September 25, 2000	Socorro	LINEAR	EOS	3.6 km	MPC · JPL
105925	2000 SD_{213}	—	September 25, 2000	Socorro	LINEAR	V	1.2 km	MPC · JPL
105926	2000 SE_{218}	—	September 26, 2000	Socorro	LINEAR	·	3.8 km	MPC · JPL
105927	2000 SV_{218}	—	September 26, 2000	Socorro	LINEAR	·	7.2 km	MPC · JPL
105928	2000 SA_{219}	—	September 26, 2000	Socorro	LINEAR	·	6.1 km	MPC · JPL
105929	2000 SU_{219}	—	September 26, 2000	Socorro	LINEAR	·	2.3 km	MPC · JPL
105930	2000 SO_{222}	—	September 26, 2000	Socorro	LINEAR	·	4.2 km	MPC · JPL
105931	2000 SV_{223}	—	September 27, 2000	Socorro	LINEAR	·	4.4 km	MPC · JPL
105932	2000 SC_{224}	—	September 27, 2000	Socorro	LINEAR	·	4.1 km	MPC · JPL
105933	2000 SG_{224}	—	September 27, 2000	Socorro	LINEAR	THM	3.8 km	MPC · JPL
105934	2000 SM_{224}	—	September 27, 2000	Socorro	LINEAR	·	4.4 km	MPC · JPL
105935	2000 SP_{224}	—	September 27, 2000	Socorro	LINEAR	T_{j} (2.99) · 3:2	11 km	MPC · JPL
105936	2000 SQ_{224}	—	September 27, 2000	Socorro	LINEAR	·	3.3 km	MPC · JPL
105937	2000 SR_{225}	—	September 27, 2000	Socorro	LINEAR	·	5.2 km	MPC · JPL
105938	2000 SL_{227}	—	September 27, 2000	Socorro	LINEAR	·	4.4 km	MPC · JPL
105939	2000 SY_{227}	—	September 28, 2000	Socorro	LINEAR	·	4.3 km	MPC · JPL
105940	2000 SR_{230}	—	September 28, 2000	Socorro	LINEAR	MAS	1.5 km	MPC · JPL
105941	2000 SX_{230}	—	September 28, 2000	Socorro	LINEAR	·	1.2 km	MPC · JPL
105942	2000 SM_{233}	—	September 21, 2000	Socorro	LINEAR	·	1.0 km	MPC · JPL
105943	2000 SY_{233}	—	September 21, 2000	Socorro	LINEAR	·	1.4 km	MPC · JPL
105944	2000 ST_{235}	—	September 24, 2000	Socorro	LINEAR	·	2.5 km	MPC · JPL
105945	2000 SU_{237}	—	September 25, 2000	Socorro	LINEAR	EOS	3.6 km	MPC · JPL
105946	2000 ST_{238}	—	September 26, 2000	Socorro	LINEAR	·	6.5 km	MPC · JPL
105947	2000 SL_{240}	—	September 25, 2000	Socorro	LINEAR	H	1.5 km	MPC · JPL
105948	2000 SZ_{240}	—	September 28, 2000	Socorro	LINEAR	H	740 m	MPC · JPL
105949	2000 SE_{242}	—	September 24, 2000	Socorro	LINEAR	·	3.1 km	MPC · JPL
105950	2000 SA_{243}	—	September 24, 2000	Socorro	LINEAR	AGN	2.5 km	MPC · JPL
105951	2000 ST_{243}	—	September 24, 2000	Socorro	LINEAR	V	1.3 km	MPC · JPL
105952	2000 SN_{246}	—	September 24, 2000	Socorro	LINEAR	(6769)	2.2 km	MPC · JPL
105953	2000 SY_{246}	—	September 24, 2000	Socorro	LINEAR	·	4.8 km	MPC · JPL
105954	2000 SS_{248}	—	September 24, 2000	Socorro	LINEAR	·	5.5 km	MPC · JPL
105955	2000 SU_{249}	—	September 24, 2000	Socorro	LINEAR	·	4.5 km	MPC · JPL
105956	2000 SX_{249}	—	September 24, 2000	Socorro	LINEAR	·	5.0 km	MPC · JPL
105957	2000 SX_{251}	—	September 24, 2000	Socorro	LINEAR	EOS	5.5 km	MPC · JPL
105958	2000 SN_{252}	—	September 24, 2000	Socorro	LINEAR	V	1.6 km	MPC · JPL
105959	2000 SX_{255}	—	September 24, 2000	Socorro	LINEAR	·	1.6 km	MPC · JPL
105960	2000 ST_{257}	—	September 24, 2000	Socorro	LINEAR	HYG	5.2 km	MPC · JPL
105961	2000 SY_{257}	—	September 24, 2000	Socorro	LINEAR	·	4.8 km	MPC · JPL
105962	2000 SB_{258}	—	September 24, 2000	Socorro	LINEAR	EOS	3.6 km	MPC · JPL
105963	2000 SR_{258}	—	September 24, 2000	Socorro	LINEAR	THM	8.1 km	MPC · JPL
105964	2000 SX_{258}	—	September 24, 2000	Socorro	LINEAR	·	1.9 km	MPC · JPL
105965	2000 SL_{259}	—	September 24, 2000	Socorro	LINEAR	·	5.8 km	MPC · JPL
105966	2000 SN_{259}	—	September 24, 2000	Socorro	LINEAR	·	2.1 km	MPC · JPL
105967	2000 SU_{259}	—	September 24, 2000	Socorro	LINEAR	·	2.7 km	MPC · JPL
105968	2000 SS_{260}	—	September 24, 2000	Socorro	LINEAR	·	5.5 km	MPC · JPL
105969	2000 SX_{261}	—	September 24, 2000	Socorro	LINEAR	·	3.5 km	MPC · JPL
105970	2000 SP_{262}	—	September 25, 2000	Socorro	LINEAR	·	5.9 km	MPC · JPL
105971	2000 SB_{263}	—	September 25, 2000	Socorro	LINEAR	·	1.8 km	MPC · JPL
105972	2000 SZ_{263}	—	September 26, 2000	Socorro	LINEAR	NYS	1.9 km	MPC · JPL
105973	2000 SE_{264}	—	September 26, 2000	Socorro	LINEAR	·	7.4 km	MPC · JPL
105974	2000 SX_{264}	—	September 26, 2000	Socorro	LINEAR	·	2.9 km	MPC · JPL
105975	2000 SJ_{265}	—	September 26, 2000	Socorro	LINEAR	·	2.1 km	MPC · JPL
105976	2000 SV_{265}	—	September 26, 2000	Socorro	LINEAR	·	5.4 km	MPC · JPL
105977	2000 SF_{266}	—	September 26, 2000	Socorro	LINEAR	·	3.1 km	MPC · JPL
105978	2000 SJ_{266}	—	September 26, 2000	Socorro	LINEAR	·	5.5 km	MPC · JPL
105979	2000 SS_{266}	—	September 26, 2000	Socorro	LINEAR	·	7.1 km	MPC · JPL
105980	2000 SN_{268}	—	September 27, 2000	Socorro	LINEAR	EOS	3.1 km	MPC · JPL
105981	2000 SS_{268}	—	September 27, 2000	Socorro	LINEAR	fast	5.5 km	MPC · JPL
105982	2000 SV_{268}	—	September 27, 2000	Socorro	LINEAR	·	6.1 km	MPC · JPL
105983	2000 SE_{269}	—	September 27, 2000	Socorro	LINEAR	·	2.2 km	MPC · JPL
105984	2000 SQ_{269}	—	September 27, 2000	Socorro	LINEAR	·	1.4 km	MPC · JPL
105985	2000 ST_{269}	—	September 27, 2000	Socorro	LINEAR	·	3.0 km	MPC · JPL
105986	2000 SX_{269}	—	September 27, 2000	Socorro	LINEAR	·	6.3 km	MPC · JPL
105987	2000 SN_{270}	—	September 27, 2000	Socorro	LINEAR	MAS	1.2 km	MPC · JPL
105988	2000 SD_{271}	—	September 27, 2000	Socorro	LINEAR	·	5.6 km	MPC · JPL
105989	2000 SV_{271}	—	September 27, 2000	Socorro	LINEAR	·	5.9 km	MPC · JPL
105990	2000 SP_{273}	—	September 28, 2000	Socorro	LINEAR	·	8.0 km	MPC · JPL
105991	2000 SC_{274}	—	September 28, 2000	Socorro	LINEAR	·	2.2 km	MPC · JPL
105992	2000 SR_{275}	—	September 28, 2000	Socorro	LINEAR	URS	11 km	MPC · JPL
105993	2000 SZ_{277}	—	September 30, 2000	Socorro	LINEAR	·	7.4 km	MPC · JPL
105994	2000 SG_{278}	—	September 30, 2000	Socorro	LINEAR	·	8.5 km	MPC · JPL
105995	2000 SN_{280}	—	September 30, 2000	Socorro	LINEAR	HYG	7.5 km	MPC · JPL
105996	2000 SZ_{280}	—	September 26, 2000	Socorro	LINEAR	H	920 m	MPC · JPL
105997	2000 SH_{281}	—	September 23, 2000	Socorro	LINEAR	EOS	3.6 km	MPC · JPL
105998	2000 SC_{283}	—	September 23, 2000	Socorro	LINEAR	·	5.9 km	MPC · JPL
105999	2000 SG_{283}	—	September 23, 2000	Socorro	LINEAR	·	5.5 km	MPC · JPL
106000	2000 SJ_{283}	—	September 23, 2000	Socorro	LINEAR	·	5.0 km	MPC · JPL

back to top

== See also ==
- Meanings of minor-planet names: 105001–106000
