= List of named minor planets: 40000–49999 =

This is a partial list of named minor planets in numerical order. It contains a total of 499 entries as of 28 September 2026. Minor planets for which no article exist are displayed in grey color and redirect to the list of minor planets (see List of minor planets § Main index).

== From 40,000 to 49,999 ==
- 40007 Vieuxtemps
- 40023 ANPCEN
- 40081 Rault
- 40092 Memel
- 40104 Stevekerr
- 40106 Erben
- 40134 Marsili
- 40198 Azarkhalatbari
- 40201 Besely
- 40206 Lhenice
- 40209 Morrispodolak
- 40210 Peixinho
- 40227 Tahiti
- 40230 Rožmberk
- 40233 Baradeau
- 40241 Deienno
- 40248 Yukikajiura
- 40328 Dow
- 40409 Taichikato
- 40410 Příhoda
- 40436 Sylviecoyaud
- 40440 Dobrovský
- 40441 Jungmann
- 40444 Palacký
- 40447 Lorenzoni
- 40457 Williamkuhn
- 40459 Rektorys
- 40463 Frankkameny
- 40684 Vanhoeck
- 40706 Milam
- 40763 Zloch
- 40764 Gerhardiser
- 40774 Iwaigame
- 40775 Kalafina
- 40776 Yeungkwongyu
- 40795 Akiratsuchiyama
- 40917 Pauljorden
- 40919 Johntonry
- 40956 Ericamsel
- 40981 Stephenholland
- 40994 Tekaridake
- 40995 Mühleis
- 41000 Aomawa
- 41001 Samuel
- 41002 Tatsumi
- 41003 Romy
- 41004 Wolner
- 41030 Mariawomack
- 41049 Van Citters
- 41058 Lynxpardinus
- 41107 Ropakov
- 41184 Devogèle
- 41199 Wakanaootaki
- 41206 Sciannameo
- 41213 Mimoun
- 41279 Trentman
- 41450 Medkeff
- 41458 Ramanjooloo
- 41481 Musashifuchu
- 41488 Sindbad
- 41502 Denchukun
- 41573 Miriamrobbins
- 41661 Heathercraig
- 41671 Benhardesty
- 41740 Yuenkwokyung
- 41742 Wongkakui
- 41795 Wiens
- 41800 Robwilliams
- 41907 Jonathanford
- 41927 Bonal
- 41943 Fredrick
- 41979 Lelumacri
- 41981 Yaobeina
- 41986 Fort Bend
- 41988 Emilyjoseph
- 42073 Noreen
- 42112 Hongkyumoon
- 42113 Jura
- 42168 Enispe
- 42175 Yuyang
- 42177 Bolin
- 42183 Tubiana
- 42191 Thurmann
- 42246 Bobanderson
- 42271 Keikokubota
- 42295 Teresateng
- 42354 Kindleberger
- 42355 Typhon
- 42365 Caligiuri
- 42377 KLENOT
- 42403 Andraimon
- 42478 Inozemtseva
- 42479 Tolik
- 42482 Fischer-Dieskau
- 42485 Stendhal
- 42487 Ångström
- 42492 Brüggenthies
- 42516 Oistrach
- 42522 Chuckberry
- 42523 Ragazzileonardo
- 42527 Mizutanimasanori
- 42531 McKenna
- 42566 Ryutaro
- 42585 Pheidippides
- 42593 Antoniazzi
- 42609 Daubechies
- 42611 Manchu
- 42613 Schaller
- 42614 Ubaldina
- 42618 Bardabelias
- 42665 Kristinblock
- 42697 Lucapaolini
- 42733 Andrébaranne
- 42747 Fuser
- 42748 Andrisani
- 42772 Kokotanekova
- 42775 Bianchini
- 42776 Casablanca
- 42795 Derekmuller
- 42837 Waltrobinson
- 42849 Podjavorinská
- 42910 Samanthalawler
- 42924 Betlem
- 42929 Francini
- 42981 Jenniskens
- 42985 Marsset
- 42998 Malinafrank
- 43025 Valusha
- 43027 Minusio
- 43028 Gnosca
- 43081 Stephenschwartz
- 43083 Frankconrad
- 43087 Castegna
- 43188 Zouxiaoduan
- 43193 Secinaro
- 43212 Katosawao
- 43224 Tonypensa
- 43259 Wangzhenyi
- 43282 Dougbock
- 43283 Robinbock
- 43293 Banting
- 43305 Camillebibles
- 43368 Rodrigoleiva
- 43414 Sfair
- 43436 Ansschut
- 43500 Chandler
- 43501 Oldroyd
- 43511 Cima Ekar
- 43574 Joyharjo
- 43597 Changshaopo
- 43605 Gakuho
- 43657 Bobmiller
- 43667 Dumlupınar
- 43669 Winterthur
- 43706 Iphiklos
- 43722 Carloseduardo
- 43724 Pechstein
- 43751 Asam
- 43752 Maryosipova
- 43753 Okadayoshirou
- 43763 Russert
- 43767 Permeke
- 43768 Lynevans
- 43775 Tiepolo
- 43783 Svyatitelpyotr
- 43790 Ferdinandbraun
- 43792 Nobutakagoto
- 43793 Mackey
- 43794 Yabetakemoto
- 43803 Wakakinosakura
- 43804 Peterting
- 43806 Augustepiccard
- 43813 Kühner
- 43841 Marcustacitus
- 43843 Cleynaerts
- 43844 Rowling
- 43851 Takemasa
- 43857 Tanijinzan
- 43859 Naoyayano
- 43870 Andokazuko
- 43881 Cerreto
- 43882 Maurivicoli
- 43889 Osawatakaomi
- 43890 Katiaottani
- 43899 Kobayashihiroki
- 43908 Hiraku
- 43923 Cosimonoccioli
- 43924 Martoni
- 43926 Takanoatsushi
- 43931 Yoshimi
- 43935 Danshechtman
- 43954 Chýnov
- 43955 Fixlmüller
- 43956 Elidoro
- 43957 Invernizzi
- 43971 Gabzdyl
- 43993 Mariola
- 43998 Nanyoshino
- 43999 Gramigna
- 44000 Lucka
- 44001 Jonquet
- 44005 Migliardi
- 44011 Juubichi
- 44013 Iidetenmondai
- 44016 Jimmypage
- 44027 Termain
- 44033 Michez
- 44039 de Sahagún
- 44041 Françoiselaunay
- 44103 Aldana
- 44110 Cassegrain
- 44117 Haroldlarson
- 44167 Patriciaquinn
- 44192 Paulguttman
- 44194 Urmuz
- 44195 Michaelcordova
- 44206 Clareschneider
- 44216 Olivercabasa
- 44217 Whittle
- 44263 Nansouty
- 44360 Ferlet
- 44368 Andreafrigo
- 44455 Artdula
- 44456 Vidal-Madjar
- 44473 Randytatum
- 44475 Hikarumasai
- 44479 Oláheszter
- 44487 Miyaharaterumasa
- 44527 Tonnon
- 44530 Horáková
- 44570 Yuribeletsky
- 44574 Lavoratti
- 44597 Thoreau
- 44613 Rudolf
- 44694 Aprilhinton
- 44711 Carp
- 44715 Paolovezzosi
- 44717 Borgoamozzano
- 44821 Amadora
- 44885 Vodička
- 44933 Therezallewelyn
- 45027 Cosquer
- 45073 Doyanrose
- 45261 Decoen
- 45298 Williamon
- 45299 Stivell
- 45300 Thewrewk
- 45305 Paulscherrer
- 45338 Ericevans
- 45492 Sławomirbreiter
- 45500 Motegi
- 45509 Robertward
- 45510 Kashuba
- 45511 Anneblack
- 45512 Holcomb
- 45517 Jett
- 45518 Larrykrozel
- 45519 Triebold
- 45580 Renéracine
- 45594 Wendyrichard
- 45595 Inman
- 45596 Molliesugden
- 45638 Teske
- 45639 Tomney
- 45640 Mikepuzio
- 45641 Larrypuzio
- 45685 Torrycoppin
- 45687 Pranverahyseni
- 45688 Lawrencestacey
- 45689 Brianjones
- 45690 Janiradebaugh
- 45692 Poshyachinda
- 45699 Maryalba
- 45700 Levi-Setti
- 45737 Benita
- 45752 Venditti
- 45846 Avdellidou
- 45847 Gartrelle
- 45855 Susumuyoshitomi
- 45878 Sadaoaoki
- 46053 Davidpatterson
- 46076 Robertschottland
- 46083 Aaronkingery
- 46095 Frédérickoby
- 46110 Altheamoorhead
- 46208 Gicquel
- 46252 Emamajerová
- 46270 Margaretlandis
- 46277 Jeffhall
- 46280 Hollar
- 46308 Joelsercel
- 46392 Bertola
- 46441 Mikepenston
- 46442 Keithtritton
- 46513 Ampzing
- 46514 Lasswitz
- 46539 Viktortikhonov
- 46563 Oken
- 46568 Stevenlee
- 46580 Ryouichiirie
- 46588 Murakamimasayuki
- 46589 Fukusako
- 46590 Akabeko
- 46592 Marinawatanabe
- 46595 Kita-Kyushu
- 46596 Tobata
- 46608 Yoshinokeiji
- 46609 Fukuzumi
- 46610 Bésixdouze
- 46631 Hosoikatsumasa
- 46632 RISE
- 46634 Minamiaizumachi
- 46643 Yanase
- 46644 Lagia
- 46649 Tsudahiroyuki
- 46669 Wangyongzhi
- 46686 Anitasohus
- 46689 Hakuryuko
- 46691 Ghezzi
- 46692 Taormina
- 46701 Interrante
- 46702 Linapucci
- 46719 Plantade
- 46720 Pierostroppa
- 46722 Ireneadler
- 46727 Hidekimatsuyama
- 46731 Prieurblanc
- 46737 Anpanman
- 46748 Giusacayrel
- 46793 Phinney
- 46796 Mamigasakigawa
- 46824 Tambora
- 46829 McMahon
- 46917 Rogercayrel
- 46920 Suzanedwards
- 46925 Bradyharan
- 46977 Krakow
- 46991 Carolinesoubiran
- 47002 Harlingten
- 47005 Chengmaolan
- 47018 Chopinet
- 47038 Majoni
- 47040 Nathbrouillet
- 47044 Mcpainter
- 47045 Seandaniel
- 47052 Guillaumefaury
- 47054 Jacquesblamont
- 47069 Tecumseh
- 47077 Yuji
- 47078 Llebaria
- 47086 Shinseiko
- 47096 Canarias
- 47144 Faulkes
- 47162 Chicomendez
- 47164 Ticino
- 47171 Lempo
- 47219 Heatherkoehler
- 47293 Masamitsu
- 47294 Blanský les
- 47466 Mayatoyoshima
- 47473 Lorenzopinna
- 47494 Gerhardangl
- 47619 Johnpursch
- 47620 Joeplassmann
- 47627 Kendomanik
- 47649 Susanbrew
- 47650 Tuthill
- 47707 Jamieson
- 47708 Jimhamilton
- 47775 Johnanderson
- 47785 Jonathanward
- 47786 Michaelleinbach
- 47835 Stevecoe
- 47843 Maxson
- 47851 Budine
- 47852 Frankydubois
- 47862 Nancyramos
- 47891 García-Migani
- 47931 Stifler
- 48047 Houghten
- 48070 Zizza
- 48159 Saint-Véran
- 48171 Juza
- 48200 Nishiokatakashi
- 48268 Comitini
- 48290 Idastraus
- 48291 Isidorstraus
- 48295 Liamgroah
- 48300 Kronk
- 48373 Gorgythion
- 48408 Yoshinogari
- 48410 Kolmogorov
- 48411 Johnventre
- 48415 Dehio
- 48416 Carmelita
- 48422 Schrade
- 48424 Souchay
- 48425 Tischendorf
- 48433 Onishi
- 48434 Maxbeckmann
- 48435 Jaspers
- 48447 Hingley
- 48448 Tokuda
- 48451 Pichincha
- 48456 Wilhelmwien
- 48457 Joseffried
- 48458 Merian
- 48461 Sabrinamaricia
- 48470 Wedemeyer
- 48471 Orchiston
- 48472 Mössbauer
- 48480 Falk
- 48482 Oruki
- 48492 Utewielen
- 48495 Ryugado
- 48498 Murahashi
- 48529 von Wrangel
- 48575 Hawaii
- 48588 Raschröder
- 48590 Asaiayumi
- 48591 Shimajiri
- 48607 Yamagatatemodai
- 48616 Yeminghan
- 48619 Jianli
- 48624 Sadayuki
- 48628 Janetfender
- 48631 Hasantufan
- 48635 Murata
- 48636 Huangkun
- 48638 Třebíč
- 48640 Eziobosso
- 48643 Allen-Beach
- 48650 Kazanuniversity
- 48680 Kamijo
- 48681 Zeilinger
- 48686 Kashimura
- 48700 Hanggao
- 48715 Balbinot
- 48720 Enricomentana
- 48736 Ehime
- 48737 Cusinato
- 48739 Kandachiyoko
- 48748 Kondoshusaku
- 48756 Yoshiharukuni
- 48767 Skamander
- 48773 Davidrowe
- 48774 Anngower
- 48778 Shokoyukako
- 48779 Mariko
- 48782 Fierz
- 48785 Pitter
- 48794 Stolzová
- 48798 Penghuanwu
- 48799 Tashikuergan
- 48801 Penninger
- 48807 Takahata
- 48838 Markackermann
- 48842 Alexmazzanti
- 48844 Belloves
- 48846 Agnèsacker
- 48886 Jonanderson
- 48888 REXIS
- 48909 Laurake
- 48915 Patbrandebourg
- 48934 Kočanová
- 48960 Clouet
- 49036 Pelion
- 49106 Janry
- 49108 Gouttesolard
- 49109 Agnesraab
- 49110 Květafialová
- 49118 Sergerochain
- 49187 Zucchini
- 49265 Raphaeljimenez
- 49272 Bryce Canyon
- 49291 Thechills
- 49294 Jacqclairnoëns
- 49296 Lucdettwiller
- 49350 Katheynix
- 49382 Lynnokamoto
- 49384 Hubertnaudot
- 49439 Jeanlouispala
- 49440 Kenzotange
- 49441 Scerbanenco
- 49442 Kubokoichi
- 49443 Marcobondi
- 49448 Macocha
- 49466 Huanglin
- 49469 Emilianomazzoni
- 49481 Gisellarubini
- 49497 Tagashiramitsuo
- 49500 Ishitoshi
- 49501 Basso
- 49698 Váchal
- 49699 Hidetakasato
- 49700 Mather
- 49702 Koikeda
- 49777 Cappi
- 49987 Bonata
back to top

== See also ==
- List of minor planet discoverers
- List of observatory codes
- Meanings of minor planet names § Index
