= Meanings of minor-planet names: 41001–42000 =

As minor planet discoveries are confirmed, they are given a permanent number by the IAU's Minor Planet Center (MPC), and the discoverers can then submit names for them, following the IAU's naming conventions. The list below concerns those minor planets in the specified number-range that have received names, and explains the meanings of those names.

Official naming citations of newly named small Solar System bodies are approved and published in a bulletin by IAU's Working Group for Small Bodies Nomenclature (WGSBN). Before May 2021, citations were published in MPC's Minor Planet Circulars for many decades. Recent citations can also be found on the JPL Small-Body Database (SBDB). Until his death in 2016, German astronomer Lutz D. Schmadel compiled these citations into the Dictionary of Minor Planet Names (DMP) and regularly updated the collection.

Based on Paul Herget's The Names of the Minor Planets, Schmadel also researched the unclear origin of numerous asteroids, most of which had been named prior to World War II. This article incorporates text from this source, which is in the public domain: SBDB New namings may only be added to this list below after official publication as the preannouncement of names is condemned. The WGSBN publishes a comprehensive guideline for the naming rules of non-cometary small Solar System bodies.

== 41001–41100 ==
Named minor planet	Provisional	This minor planet was named for...	Ref · Catalog
41001 Samuel	1999 UG_{9}	Samuel Myers, American planetary scientist.	IAU · 41001
41002 Tatsumi	1999 UW_{12}	Eri Tatsumi, Japanese planetary scientist.	IAU · 41002
41003 Romy	1999 UZ_{12}	Romy Hanna, American planetary scientist.	IAU · 41003
41004 Wolner	1999 UA_{13}	Catherine “Cat” Wallace Vaccaro Wolner, American scientific editor and writer.	IAU · 41004
41030 Mariawomack	1999 UQ_{46}	Maria Womack (born 1963) is a researcher at the Florida Space Institute at the University of Central Florida (Orlando, FL). She has served as a professor at multiple universities and a program director for the National Science Foundation. Her research includes studies of comets and active centaurs.	IAU · 41030
41049 Van Citters	1999 VC_{9}	G. Wayne Van Citters, American astronomer	JPL · 41049
41058 Lynxpardinus	1999 VC_{24}	Lynx pardinus, commonly known as the Iberian lynx, is a wild cat species endemic to the Iberian Peninsula.	IAU · 41058

== 41101–41200 ==
back to top

Named minor planet	Provisional	This minor planet was named for...	Ref · Catalog
41107 Ropakov	1999 VX_{72}	Ivan V. Ropakov, grandfather of the second discoverer	JPL · 41107
41184 Devogèle	1999 VW_{199}	Maxime Devogèle (born 1989) is a postdoctoral associate at Lowell Observatory who received his Ph.D. in 2017 from the Universite de Liège and the Universite Côte d'Azur. His work includes measuring the polarimetric properties of near-Earth and Main Belt asteroids.	IAU · 41184
41199 Wakanaootaki	1999 WC_{1}	Wakana Ootaki (born 1984) is a Japanese vocalist and original member of the musical group "Kalafina". She has also performed with "FictionJunction".	JPL · 41199

== 41201–41300 ==
back to top

Named minor planet	Provisional	This minor planet was named for...	Ref · Catalog
41206 Sciannameo	1999 WG_{9}	Francesco Sciannameo (born 1941), Italian professor of general surgery, head physician of the Terni hospital, and amateur astronomer	JPL · 41206
41213 Mimoun	1999 XG_{2}	Alain Mimoun (1921–2013) was a French long-distance runner, and marathon champion at the 1956 Olympics in Melbourne.	JPL · 41213
41279 Trentman	1999 XD_{95}	Richard Trentman (born 1939), American amateur astronomer and team member of the Powell Observatory Near-Earth-Object follow-up program	JPL · 41279

== 41301–41400 ==
back to top

Named minor planet	Provisional	This minor planet was named for...	Ref · Catalog
There are no named minor planets in this number range

== 41401–41500 ==
back to top

Named minor planet	Provisional	This minor planet was named for...	Ref · Catalog
41450 Medkeff	2000 LF_{15}	Jeff Medkeff, American designer of software for robotic operations of observatories, telescope control, data reduction and automatic submission of results to the Minor Planet Center †	MPC · 41450
41458 Ramanjooloo	2000 NN_{14}	Yudish Ramanjooloo (born 1985) is a Junior Researcher at the University of Hawaii in Honolulu, USA. His main research interests include studying near-Earth objects, and the interaction between solar wind and the induced magnetosphere of comets, and exoplanets.	IAU · 41458
41481 Musashifuchu	2000 QE_{35}	Fuchu is the name of the place where Kokuhu (the ancient Japanese provincial government office) was located. Fuchu City in Tokyo Metropolis has been called Musashi Fuchu, because it was the Kokuhu of the province of Musashi. Its name symbolizes the history and culture of the city.	JPL · 41481
41488 Sindbad	2000 QE_{71}	Sindbad, legendary sailor from Baghdad whose numerous fantastic adventures are recounted in The Arabian Nights	JPL · 41488

== 41501–41600 ==
back to top

Named minor planet	Provisional	This minor planet was named for...	Ref · Catalog
41502 Denchukun	2000 QK_{147}	Denchukun is the official mascot character of Ibara city, Okayama, Japan. Its name originates from Denchu Hirakushi, a sculptor born in Ibara. Its shape represents a star in the famous Kabuki play Kagami-Jishi.	JPL · 41502
41573 Miriamrobbins	2000 RB_{99}	Miriam Robbins (b. 1971), an American Visitor Experience Manager for Lowell Observatory and past chapter president for the Museum Store Association.	IAU · 41573

== 41601–41700 ==
back to top

Named minor planet	Provisional	This minor planet was named for...	Ref · Catalog
41661 Heathercraig	2000 SK_{369}	Heather Craig (b. 1995), the marketing operations specialist for Lowell Observatory and cofounder of Astronomy on Tap Flagstaff, U.S.A.	IAU · 41661
41671 Benhardesty	2000 TF_{34}	Benjamin Hardesty (b. 1988), an Instrument Scientist at Lowell Observatory.	IAU · 41671

== 41701–41800 ==
back to top

Named minor planet	Provisional	This minor planet was named for...	Ref · Catalog
41740 Yuenkwokyung	2000 VC	Yuen Kwok-yung (born 1956) is a Hong Kong microbiologist, physician and surgeon, with over 700 publications in peer-reviewed journals. During the global outbreak of SARS in 2003, he led his team in the discovery of the SARS coronavirus, being honored as "Asian heroes of the year" in the 2013 April issue of Time Asia.	JPL · 41740
41742 Wongkakui	2000 VH_{3}	Wong Ka Kui (1962–1993) was a Hong Kong singer and songwriter, best known for being the lead vocalist, rhythm guitarist and main songwriter of the rock band Beyond, which he founded.	JPL · 41742
41795 Wiens	2000 WN_{12}	Roger Wiens (born 1960) is deeply involved in space missions. He is the Principal Investigator behind ChemCam, a laser spectroscopy instrument on board the Mars Curiosity Rover. Name and citation provided by S. Le Mouelic.	JPL · 41795
41800 Robwilliams	2000 WM_{19}	Robert A. Williams (b. 1942), American psychiatrist and author, director of the Biological Psychiatry Institute in Phoenix, Arizona	JPL · 41800

== 41801–41900 ==
back to top

Named minor planet	Provisional	This minor planet was named for...	Ref · Catalog
There are no named minor planets in this number range

== 41901–42000 ==
back to top

Named minor planet	Provisional	This minor planet was named for...	Ref · Catalog
41907 Jonathanford	2000 WF_{137}	Jonathan (Jon) Ford (b. 1959), a Senior Educator at Lowell Observatory.	IAU · 41907
41927 Bonal	2000 WM_{166}	Lydie Bonal (born 1980) is a scientist at IPAG (Grenoble, France). She studies micrometeorites, mission samples, and Raman spectroscopy, with a focus on primitive matter, including organics, of planetary materials.	IAU · 41927
41943 Fredrick	2000 XH_{2}	Richard Fredrick, American amateur astronomer and team member of the Powell Observatory Near-Earth-Object follow-up program	JPL · 41943
41979 Lelumacri	2000 YK_{16}	Luca Pacciorini (born 1958), his partner Cristina Conedera (born 1965) and their two children, Letizia (born 2000) and Martino (born 2002), are friends of the discoverer.	JPL · 41979
41981 Yaobeina	2000 YD_{21}	Yao Beina (1981–2015) was a talented and courageous Chinese singer who won numerous awards for the best Chinese pop song performance. One of Yao's famous songs, "Fire of the Heart", was about the reflections on her battle with breast cancer. She donated her corneas.	JPL · 41981
41986 Fort Bend	2000 YR_{29}	Fort Bend Astronomy Club of Stafford, Texas, USA, several of whose members are asteroid discoverers (J. L. Casady, A. Cruz, P. Garossino, C. Gustava, A. Lowe, D. Wells)	JPL · 41986
41988 Emilyjoseph	2000 YX_{30}	Emily C. S. Joseph (born 1988), an American planetary scientist and member of the VIMS instrument team for the Cassini–Huygens spaceprobe at the University of Arizona. As a public health researcher, she also took part in the university's COVID-19 response.	IAU · 41988

back to top

Preceded by 40,001–41,000	Meanings of minor-planet names List of minor planets: 41,001–42,000	Succeeded by 42,001–43,000
