= List of minor planets: 41001–42000 =

The following is a partial list of minor planets, running from minor-planet number 41001 through 42000, inclusive. The primary data for this and other partial lists is based on JPL's "Small-Body Orbital Elements" and data available from the Minor Planet Center. Critical list information is also provided by the MPC, unless otherwise specified from Lowell Observatory. A detailed description of the table's columns and additional sources are given on the main page including a complete list of every page in this series, and a statistical break-up on the dynamical classification of minor planets.

Also see the summary list of all named bodies in numerical and alphabetical order, and the corresponding naming citations for the number range of this particular list. New namings may only be added to this list after official publication, as the preannouncement of names is condemned by the Working Group for Small Bodies Nomenclature of the International Astronomical Union.

Near-Earth obj.	MBA (inner)	MBA (outer)	Centaur
Mars-crosser	MBA (middle)	Jupiter trojan	Trans-Neptunian obj.
Unclassified

== 41001–41100 ==
Designation			Discovery			Properties		Ref
Permanent	Provisional	Named after	Date	Site	Discoverer(s)	Category	Diam.	Ref
41001 Samuel	1999 UG_{9}	Samuel	October 29, 1999	Catalina	CSS	VER	8.3 km	MPC · JPL
41002 Tatsumi	1999 UW_{12}	Tatsumi	October 29, 1999	Catalina	CSS	·	5.2 km	MPC · JPL
41003 Romy	1999 UZ_{12}	Romy	October 29, 1999	Catalina	CSS	·	5.5 km	MPC · JPL
41004 Wolner	1999 UA_{13}	Wolner	October 29, 1999	Catalina	CSS	·	4.6 km	MPC · JPL
41005	1999 UJ_{13}	—	October 29, 1999	Catalina	CSS	·	2.7 km	MPC · JPL
41006	1999 UM_{13}	—	October 29, 1999	Catalina	CSS	·	2.4 km	MPC · JPL
41007	1999 UN_{14}	—	October 29, 1999	Catalina	CSS	(5)	3.1 km	MPC · JPL
41008	1999 UR_{14}	—	October 29, 1999	Catalina	CSS	·	3.8 km	MPC · JPL
41009	1999 UG_{15}	—	October 29, 1999	Catalina	CSS	fast	9.2 km	MPC · JPL
41010	1999 UN_{15}	—	October 29, 1999	Catalina	CSS	KOR	3.6 km	MPC · JPL
41011	1999 UB_{16}	—	October 29, 1999	Catalina	CSS	KOR	3.3 km	MPC · JPL
41012	1999 UD_{17}	—	October 30, 1999	Catalina	CSS	HYG	7.3 km	MPC · JPL
41013	1999 UH_{22}	—	October 31, 1999	Kitt Peak	Spacewatch	·	2.3 km	MPC · JPL
41014	1999 UP_{23}	—	October 28, 1999	Catalina	CSS	slow	7.7 km	MPC · JPL
41015	1999 UB_{24}	—	October 28, 1999	Catalina	CSS	·	11 km	MPC · JPL
41016	1999 UR_{24}	—	October 28, 1999	Catalina	CSS	·	6.6 km	MPC · JPL
41017	1999 UJ_{26}	—	October 30, 1999	Catalina	CSS	·	7.1 km	MPC · JPL
41018	1999 UB_{27}	—	October 31, 1999	Catalina	CSS	·	6.6 km	MPC · JPL
41019	1999 UV_{29}	—	October 31, 1999	Kitt Peak	Spacewatch	·	3.7 km	MPC · JPL
41020	1999 UO_{30}	—	October 31, 1999	Kitt Peak	Spacewatch	·	2.2 km	MPC · JPL
41021	1999 UL_{32}	—	October 31, 1999	Kitt Peak	Spacewatch	·	4.5 km	MPC · JPL
41022	1999 UZ_{36}	—	October 16, 1999	Kitt Peak	Spacewatch	·	2.4 km	MPC · JPL
41023	1999 UT_{38}	—	October 29, 1999	Anderson Mesa	LONEOS	HYG	7.2 km	MPC · JPL
41024	1999 UW_{38}	—	October 29, 1999	Anderson Mesa	LONEOS	NEM	7.0 km	MPC · JPL
41025	1999 UY_{38}	—	October 29, 1999	Anderson Mesa	LONEOS	PAD	7.3 km	MPC · JPL
41026	1999 UC_{40}	—	October 16, 1999	Socorro	LINEAR	·	5.9 km	MPC · JPL
41027	1999 UP_{44}	—	October 30, 1999	Anderson Mesa	LONEOS	·	4.3 km	MPC · JPL
41028	1999 UL_{45}	—	October 31, 1999	Catalina	CSS	MAR	2.8 km	MPC · JPL
41029	1999 UY_{45}	—	October 31, 1999	Catalina	CSS	EOS	4.3 km	MPC · JPL
41030 Mariawomack	1999 UQ_{46}	Mariawomack	October 31, 1999	Anderson Mesa	LONEOS	MAR	4.4 km	MPC · JPL
41031	1999 UA_{47}	—	October 29, 1999	Catalina	CSS	EOS	6.4 km	MPC · JPL
41032	1999 UC_{48}	—	October 30, 1999	Catalina	CSS	·	7.2 km	MPC · JPL
41033	1999 UW_{48}	—	October 31, 1999	Catalina	CSS	MAR	3.8 km	MPC · JPL
41034	1999 UJ_{49}	—	October 31, 1999	Catalina	CSS	·	6.0 km	MPC · JPL
41035	1999 UT_{50}	—	October 30, 1999	Catalina	CSS	·	6.5 km	MPC · JPL
41036	1999 UH_{51}	—	October 31, 1999	Catalina	CSS	(1298)	8.5 km	MPC · JPL
41037	1999 US_{51}	—	October 31, 1999	Kitt Peak	Spacewatch	fast	3.5 km	MPC · JPL
41038	1999 UX_{52}	—	October 31, 1999	Catalina	CSS	EOS	6.5 km	MPC · JPL
41039	1999 UX_{56}	—	October 29, 1999	Catalina	CSS	slow	4.9 km	MPC · JPL
41040	1999 VR	—	November 2, 1999	Oohira	T. Urata	THM	7.5 km	MPC · JPL
41041	1999 VV_{1}	—	November 4, 1999	Gekko	T. Kagawa	·	5.0 km	MPC · JPL
41042	1999 VB_{2}	—	November 3, 1999	Dynic	A. Sugie	T_{j} (2.99)	18 km	MPC · JPL
41043	1999 VW_{4}	—	November 5, 1999	Višnjan Observatory	K. Korlević	(5)	4.2 km	MPC · JPL
41044	1999 VW_{6}	—	November 8, 1999	Fountain Hills	C. W. Juels	·	5.9 km	MPC · JPL
41045	1999 VX_{6}	—	November 8, 1999	Fountain Hills	C. W. Juels	·	5.9 km	MPC · JPL
41046	1999 VZ_{6}	—	November 8, 1999	Fountain Hills	C. W. Juels	·	7.1 km	MPC · JPL
41047	1999 VP_{7}	—	November 7, 1999	Višnjan Observatory	K. Korlević	·	3.2 km	MPC · JPL
41048	1999 VQ_{7}	—	November 7, 1999	Višnjan Observatory	K. Korlević	·	4.9 km	MPC · JPL
41049 Van Citters	1999 VC_{9}	Van Citters	November 9, 1999	Fountain Hills	C. W. Juels	·	4.3 km	MPC · JPL
41050	1999 VF_{9}	—	November 8, 1999	Višnjan Observatory	K. Korlević	EUN	5.4 km	MPC · JPL
41051	1999 VR_{10}	—	November 9, 1999	Oizumi	T. Kobayashi	EOS	11 km	MPC · JPL
41052	1999 VJ_{16}	—	November 2, 1999	Kitt Peak	Spacewatch	·	5.7 km	MPC · JPL
41053	1999 VH_{18}	—	November 2, 1999	Kitt Peak	Spacewatch	·	8.4 km	MPC · JPL
41054	1999 VL_{18}	—	November 2, 1999	Kitt Peak	Spacewatch	·	4.5 km	MPC · JPL
41055	1999 VD_{20}	—	November 10, 1999	Višnjan Observatory	K. Korlević	·	4.6 km	MPC · JPL
41056	1999 VX_{20}	—	November 9, 1999	Monte Agliale	Ziboli, M.	GEF	4.5 km	MPC · JPL
41057	1999 VU_{22}	—	November 12, 1999	Farpoint	G. Hug, G. Bell	·	5.4 km	MPC · JPL
41058 Lynxpardinus	1999 VC_{24}	Lynxpardinus	November 8, 1999	Majorca	R. Pacheco, Á. López J.	HYG	8.3 km	MPC · JPL
41059	1999 VC_{26}	—	November 3, 1999	Socorro	LINEAR	THM	6.6 km	MPC · JPL
41060	1999 VB_{28}	—	November 3, 1999	Socorro	LINEAR	KOR	3.7 km	MPC · JPL
41061	1999 VD_{28}	—	November 3, 1999	Socorro	LINEAR	PAD	6.9 km	MPC · JPL
41062	1999 VC_{29}	—	November 3, 1999	Socorro	LINEAR	THM	7.3 km	MPC · JPL
41063	1999 VE_{29}	—	November 3, 1999	Socorro	LINEAR	·	5.7 km	MPC · JPL
41064	1999 VK_{29}	—	November 3, 1999	Socorro	LINEAR	THM	7.6 km	MPC · JPL
41065	1999 VR_{29}	—	November 3, 1999	Socorro	LINEAR	KOR	3.7 km	MPC · JPL
41066	1999 VO_{31}	—	November 3, 1999	Socorro	LINEAR	·	4.3 km	MPC · JPL
41067	1999 VG_{32}	—	November 3, 1999	Socorro	LINEAR	·	8.2 km	MPC · JPL
41068	1999 VO_{32}	—	November 3, 1999	Socorro	LINEAR	·	3.0 km	MPC · JPL
41069	1999 VJ_{33}	—	November 3, 1999	Socorro	LINEAR	·	3.8 km	MPC · JPL
41070	1999 VS_{34}	—	November 3, 1999	Socorro	LINEAR	·	9.7 km	MPC · JPL
41071	1999 VY_{36}	—	November 3, 1999	Socorro	LINEAR	·	5.4 km	MPC · JPL
41072	1999 VX_{38}	—	November 10, 1999	Socorro	LINEAR	·	4.9 km	MPC · JPL
41073	1999 VG_{39}	—	November 10, 1999	Socorro	LINEAR	·	5.4 km	MPC · JPL
41074	1999 VL_{40}	—	November 13, 1999	Anderson Mesa	LONEOS	·	3.8 km	MPC · JPL
41075	1999 VG_{43}	—	November 1, 1999	Catalina	CSS	KOR	3.0 km	MPC · JPL
41076	1999 VH_{43}	—	November 1, 1999	Catalina	CSS	·	6.6 km	MPC · JPL
41077	1999 VT_{43}	—	November 1, 1999	Catalina	CSS	·	4.2 km	MPC · JPL
41078	1999 VB_{44}	—	November 3, 1999	Catalina	CSS	·	6.7 km	MPC · JPL
41079	1999 VP_{45}	—	November 4, 1999	Catalina	CSS	HOF	9.2 km	MPC · JPL
41080	1999 VX_{45}	—	November 4, 1999	Catalina	CSS	·	14 km	MPC · JPL
41081	1999 VW_{47}	—	November 3, 1999	Socorro	LINEAR	EOS	6.3 km	MPC · JPL
41082	1999 VQ_{48}	—	November 3, 1999	Socorro	LINEAR	·	5.2 km	MPC · JPL
41083	1999 VO_{50}	—	November 3, 1999	Socorro	LINEAR	KOR	7.0 km	MPC · JPL
41084	1999 VC_{52}	—	November 3, 1999	Socorro	LINEAR	·	8.1 km	MPC · JPL
41085	1999 VL_{55}	—	November 4, 1999	Socorro	LINEAR	KOR	3.1 km	MPC · JPL
41086	1999 VU_{55}	—	November 4, 1999	Socorro	LINEAR	KOR	3.1 km	MPC · JPL
41087	1999 VS_{56}	—	November 4, 1999	Socorro	LINEAR	·	3.4 km	MPC · JPL
41088	1999 VO_{57}	—	November 4, 1999	Socorro	LINEAR	KOR	3.0 km	MPC · JPL
41089	1999 VM_{58}	—	November 4, 1999	Socorro	LINEAR	·	3.5 km	MPC · JPL
41090	1999 VS_{59}	—	November 4, 1999	Socorro	LINEAR	KOR	3.9 km	MPC · JPL
41091	1999 VY_{59}	—	November 4, 1999	Socorro	LINEAR	·	3.8 km	MPC · JPL
41092	1999 VD_{60}	—	November 4, 1999	Socorro	LINEAR	HYG	7.6 km	MPC · JPL
41093	1999 VR_{60}	—	November 4, 1999	Socorro	LINEAR	KOR	3.4 km	MPC · JPL
41094	1999 VH_{61}	—	November 4, 1999	Socorro	LINEAR	KOR	3.4 km	MPC · JPL
41095	1999 VK_{61}	—	November 4, 1999	Socorro	LINEAR	EOS	5.2 km	MPC · JPL
41096	1999 VN_{61}	—	November 4, 1999	Socorro	LINEAR	·	4.7 km	MPC · JPL
41097	1999 VO_{61}	—	November 4, 1999	Socorro	LINEAR	·	4.5 km	MPC · JPL
41098	1999 VG_{63}	—	November 4, 1999	Socorro	LINEAR	·	4.5 km	MPC · JPL
41099	1999 VL_{64}	—	November 4, 1999	Socorro	LINEAR	·	4.8 km	MPC · JPL
41100	1999 VW_{64}	—	November 4, 1999	Socorro	LINEAR	·	6.0 km	MPC · JPL

== 41101–41200 ==
back to top

Designation			Discovery			Properties		Ref
Permanent	Provisional	Named after	Date	Site	Discoverer(s)	Category	Diam.	Ref
41101	1999 VE_{65}	—	November 4, 1999	Socorro	LINEAR	·	4.8 km	MPC · JPL
41102	1999 VX_{66}	—	November 4, 1999	Socorro	LINEAR	·	6.5 km	MPC · JPL
41103	1999 VE_{67}	—	November 4, 1999	Socorro	LINEAR	·	11 km	MPC · JPL
41104	1999 VG_{67}	—	November 4, 1999	Socorro	LINEAR	KOR	3.7 km	MPC · JPL
41105	1999 VR_{67}	—	November 4, 1999	Socorro	LINEAR	·	9.6 km	MPC · JPL
41106	1999 VL_{69}	—	November 4, 1999	Socorro	LINEAR	THM	9.0 km	MPC · JPL
41107 Ropakov	1999 VX_{72}	Ropakov	November 1, 1999	Uccle	E. W. Elst, Ipatov, S.	·	2.9 km	MPC · JPL
41108	1999 VT_{73}	—	November 1, 1999	Kitt Peak	Spacewatch	·	4.6 km	MPC · JPL
41109	1999 VC_{75}	—	November 5, 1999	Kitt Peak	Spacewatch	·	7.2 km	MPC · JPL
41110	1999 VB_{78}	—	November 4, 1999	Socorro	LINEAR	MAR	3.2 km	MPC · JPL
41111	1999 VF_{80}	—	November 4, 1999	Socorro	LINEAR	EUN	3.9 km	MPC · JPL
41112	1999 VP_{82}	—	November 5, 1999	Socorro	LINEAR	EOS	6.1 km	MPC · JPL
41113	1999 VQ_{83}	—	November 2, 1999	Kitt Peak	Spacewatch	·	3.3 km	MPC · JPL
41114	1999 VC_{84}	—	November 3, 1999	Kitt Peak	Spacewatch	·	7.4 km	MPC · JPL
41115	1999 VQ_{85}	—	November 5, 1999	Catalina	CSS	MAR	4.4 km	MPC · JPL
41116	1999 VT_{85}	—	November 4, 1999	Socorro	LINEAR	AGN	3.7 km	MPC · JPL
41117	1999 VM_{87}	—	November 4, 1999	Socorro	LINEAR	·	3.6 km	MPC · JPL
41118	1999 VT_{87}	—	November 5, 1999	Socorro	LINEAR	EOS	6.2 km	MPC · JPL
41119	1999 VV_{87}	—	November 7, 1999	Socorro	LINEAR	·	4.6 km	MPC · JPL
41120	1999 VX_{87}	—	November 7, 1999	Socorro	LINEAR	EOS	4.4 km	MPC · JPL
41121	1999 VP_{89}	—	November 5, 1999	Socorro	LINEAR	THM	6.0 km	MPC · JPL
41122	1999 VD_{90}	—	November 5, 1999	Socorro	LINEAR	·	9.4 km	MPC · JPL
41123	1999 VX_{90}	—	November 5, 1999	Socorro	LINEAR	·	4.9 km	MPC · JPL
41124	1999 VG_{91}	—	November 5, 1999	Socorro	LINEAR	·	4.3 km	MPC · JPL
41125	1999 VD_{92}	—	November 9, 1999	Socorro	LINEAR	EOS	4.6 km	MPC · JPL
41126	1999 VQ_{92}	—	November 9, 1999	Socorro	LINEAR	THM	5.4 km	MPC · JPL
41127	1999 VZ_{92}	—	November 9, 1999	Socorro	LINEAR	·	4.6 km	MPC · JPL
41128	1999 VA_{93}	—	November 9, 1999	Socorro	LINEAR	·	6.2 km	MPC · JPL
41129	1999 VD_{94}	—	November 9, 1999	Socorro	LINEAR	KOR	3.0 km	MPC · JPL
41130	1999 VC_{96}	—	November 9, 1999	Socorro	LINEAR	·	2.8 km	MPC · JPL
41131	1999 VA_{98}	—	November 9, 1999	Socorro	LINEAR	·	3.5 km	MPC · JPL
41132	1999 VC_{98}	—	November 9, 1999	Socorro	LINEAR	·	4.6 km	MPC · JPL
41133	1999 VF_{98}	—	November 9, 1999	Socorro	LINEAR	·	2.5 km	MPC · JPL
41134	1999 VP_{100}	—	November 9, 1999	Socorro	LINEAR	·	4.8 km	MPC · JPL
41135	1999 VP_{103}	—	November 9, 1999	Socorro	LINEAR	·	3.4 km	MPC · JPL
41136	1999 VL_{104}	—	November 9, 1999	Socorro	LINEAR	·	5.5 km	MPC · JPL
41137	1999 VE_{114}	—	November 9, 1999	Catalina	CSS	TEL	3.9 km	MPC · JPL
41138	1999 VZ_{114}	—	November 9, 1999	Catalina	CSS	EOS	5.9 km	MPC · JPL
41139	1999 VU_{119}	—	November 3, 1999	Kitt Peak	Spacewatch	NYS	2.6 km	MPC · JPL
41140	1999 VV_{122}	—	November 5, 1999	Kitt Peak	Spacewatch	·	6.4 km	MPC · JPL
41141	1999 VB_{125}	—	November 10, 1999	Socorro	LINEAR	·	2.1 km	MPC · JPL
41142	1999 VF_{125}	—	November 6, 1999	Kitt Peak	Spacewatch	·	4.4 km	MPC · JPL
41143	1999 VR_{129}	—	November 11, 1999	Kitt Peak	Spacewatch	NAE	5.1 km	MPC · JPL
41144	1999 VA_{131}	—	November 9, 1999	Kitt Peak	Spacewatch	·	7.4 km	MPC · JPL
41145	1999 VW_{135}	—	November 9, 1999	Socorro	LINEAR	KOR	2.9 km	MPC · JPL
41146	1999 VS_{136}	—	November 12, 1999	Socorro	LINEAR	·	2.8 km	MPC · JPL
41147	1999 VK_{137}	—	November 12, 1999	Socorro	LINEAR	THM	5.7 km	MPC · JPL
41148	1999 VU_{143}	—	November 11, 1999	Catalina	CSS	·	5.8 km	MPC · JPL
41149	1999 VQ_{144}	—	November 11, 1999	Catalina	CSS	HYG	7.9 km	MPC · JPL
41150	1999 VE_{146}	—	November 12, 1999	Socorro	LINEAR	AST	4.3 km	MPC · JPL
41151	1999 VH_{148}	—	November 14, 1999	Socorro	LINEAR	EUN	3.2 km	MPC · JPL
41152	1999 VW_{148}	—	November 14, 1999	Socorro	LINEAR	THM	6.3 km	MPC · JPL
41153	1999 VB_{150}	—	November 14, 1999	Socorro	LINEAR	·	6.3 km	MPC · JPL
41154	1999 VO_{151}	—	November 14, 1999	Socorro	LINEAR	·	8.5 km	MPC · JPL
41155	1999 VG_{157}	—	November 14, 1999	Socorro	LINEAR	·	2.9 km	MPC · JPL
41156	1999 VV_{157}	—	November 14, 1999	Socorro	LINEAR	KON	6.9 km	MPC · JPL
41157	1999 VX_{159}	—	November 14, 1999	Socorro	LINEAR	EUN	3.9 km	MPC · JPL
41158	1999 VG_{160}	—	November 14, 1999	Socorro	LINEAR	·	6.6 km	MPC · JPL
41159	1999 VE_{161}	—	November 14, 1999	Socorro	LINEAR	KOR	2.8 km	MPC · JPL
41160	1999 VP_{163}	—	November 14, 1999	Socorro	LINEAR	KOR	3.2 km	MPC · JPL
41161	1999 VM_{165}	—	November 14, 1999	Socorro	LINEAR	EOS	3.9 km	MPC · JPL
41162	1999 VM_{168}	—	November 14, 1999	Socorro	LINEAR	·	7.0 km	MPC · JPL
41163	1999 VX_{168}	—	November 14, 1999	Socorro	LINEAR	·	6.3 km	MPC · JPL
41164	1999 VO_{169}	—	November 14, 1999	Socorro	LINEAR	·	4.2 km	MPC · JPL
41165	1999 VW_{170}	—	November 14, 1999	Socorro	LINEAR	EOS	7.0 km	MPC · JPL
41166	1999 VJ_{172}	—	November 14, 1999	Socorro	LINEAR	HYG	8.6 km	MPC · JPL
41167	1999 VV_{172}	—	November 14, 1999	Socorro	LINEAR	EOS	5.2 km	MPC · JPL
41168	1999 VB_{174}	—	November 3, 1999	Anderson Mesa	LONEOS	·	5.7 km	MPC · JPL
41169	1999 VL_{174}	—	November 12, 1999	Anderson Mesa	LONEOS	·	5.3 km	MPC · JPL
41170	1999 VW_{175}	—	November 1, 1999	Catalina	CSS	·	7.8 km	MPC · JPL
41171	1999 VJ_{176}	—	November 4, 1999	Socorro	LINEAR	EUN	3.6 km	MPC · JPL
41172	1999 VT_{176}	—	November 5, 1999	Socorro	LINEAR	KOR	2.7 km	MPC · JPL
41173	1999 VP_{180}	—	November 6, 1999	Socorro	LINEAR	·	6.2 km	MPC · JPL
41174	1999 VH_{184}	—	November 15, 1999	Socorro	LINEAR	·	10 km	MPC · JPL
41175	1999 VN_{185}	—	November 15, 1999	Socorro	LINEAR	·	4.7 km	MPC · JPL
41176	1999 VP_{186}	—	November 15, 1999	Socorro	LINEAR	EUN	3.1 km	MPC · JPL
41177	1999 VB_{187}	—	November 15, 1999	Socorro	LINEAR	VER	7.7 km	MPC · JPL
41178	1999 VY_{187}	—	November 15, 1999	Socorro	LINEAR	·	4.4 km	MPC · JPL
41179	1999 VW_{192}	—	November 1, 1999	Anderson Mesa	LONEOS	·	4.2 km	MPC · JPL
41180	1999 VQ_{193}	—	November 2, 1999	Kitt Peak	Spacewatch	·	2.5 km	MPC · JPL
41181	1999 VR_{194}	—	November 1, 1999	Catalina	CSS	JUN	2.1 km	MPC · JPL
41182	1999 VL_{195}	—	November 3, 1999	Catalina	CSS	HYG	7.7 km	MPC · JPL
41183	1999 VP_{195}	—	November 3, 1999	Catalina	CSS	·	4.5 km	MPC · JPL
41184 Devogèle	1999 VW_{199}	Devogèle	November 4, 1999	Anderson Mesa	LONEOS	WAT	5.3 km	MPC · JPL
41185	1999 VJ_{200}	—	November 5, 1999	Catalina	CSS	TIR	7.4 km	MPC · JPL
41186	1999 VT_{200}	—	November 5, 1999	Catalina	CSS	·	2.6 km	MPC · JPL
41187	1999 VB_{201}	—	November 6, 1999	Catalina	CSS	PHO	2.3 km	MPC · JPL
41188	1999 VC_{201}	—	November 6, 1999	Catalina	CSS	LUT	12 km	MPC · JPL
41189	1999 VE_{201}	—	November 6, 1999	Catalina	CSS	·	12 km	MPC · JPL
41190	1999 VJ_{203}	—	November 8, 1999	Anderson Mesa	LONEOS	·	2.7 km	MPC · JPL
41191	1999 VL_{203}	—	November 8, 1999	Catalina	CSS	·	9.1 km	MPC · JPL
41192	1999 VB_{206}	—	November 12, 1999	Socorro	LINEAR	(1298)	6.1 km	MPC · JPL
41193	1999 VV_{206}	—	November 10, 1999	Anderson Mesa	LONEOS	·	4.0 km	MPC · JPL
41194	1999 VH_{213}	—	November 12, 1999	Anderson Mesa	LONEOS	·	6.5 km	MPC · JPL
41195	1999 VL_{221}	—	November 4, 1999	Socorro	LINEAR	·	4.8 km	MPC · JPL
41196	1999 VV_{224}	—	November 5, 1999	Socorro	LINEAR	·	5.1 km	MPC · JPL
41197	1999 VU_{228}	—	November 3, 1999	Catalina	CSS	·	5.4 km	MPC · JPL
41198	1999 WB	—	November 16, 1999	Fountain Hills	C. W. Juels	·	4.4 km	MPC · JPL
41199 Wakanaootaki	1999 WC_{1}	Wakanaootaki	November 21, 1999	Goodricke-Pigott	R. A. Tucker	·	5.5 km	MPC · JPL
41200	1999 WA_{3}	—	November 27, 1999	Višnjan Observatory	K. Korlević	·	10 km	MPC · JPL

== 41201–41300 ==
back to top

Designation			Discovery			Properties		Ref
Permanent	Provisional	Named after	Date	Site	Discoverer(s)	Category	Diam.	Ref
41201	1999 WF_{4}	—	November 28, 1999	Oizumi	T. Kobayashi	·	6.8 km	MPC · JPL
41202	1999 WX_{6}	—	November 28, 1999	Višnjan Observatory	K. Korlević	EOS	4.9 km	MPC · JPL
41203	1999 WK_{7}	—	November 28, 1999	Višnjan Observatory	K. Korlević	LIX	13 km	MPC · JPL
41204	1999 WX_{8}	—	November 28, 1999	Gnosca	S. Sposetti	·	20 km	MPC · JPL
41205	1999 WZ_{8}	—	November 28, 1999	Gnosca	S. Sposetti	·	3.1 km	MPC · JPL
41206 Sciannameo	1999 WG_{9}	Sciannameo	November 27, 1999	Osservatorio Polino	Polino, Osservatorio	EUN	3.9 km	MPC · JPL
41207	1999 WK_{9}	—	November 29, 1999	Bédoin	P. Antonini	·	2.3 km	MPC · JPL
41208	1999 WL_{9}	—	November 29, 1999	Farra d'Isonzo	Farra d'Isonzo	(5)	3.0 km	MPC · JPL
41209	1999 WB_{15}	—	November 29, 1999	Kitt Peak	Spacewatch	WIT	3.3 km	MPC · JPL
41210	1999 WN_{18}	—	November 27, 1999	Anderson Mesa	LONEOS	·	3.0 km	MPC · JPL
41211	1999 XB_{1}	—	December 2, 1999	Oizumi	T. Kobayashi	CYB	8.7 km	MPC · JPL
41212	1999 XO_{1}	—	December 2, 1999	Socorro	LINEAR	·	3.5 km	MPC · JPL
41213 Mimoun	1999 XG_{2}	Mimoun	December 2, 1999	Les Tardieux Obs.	Boeuf, M.	·	4.7 km	MPC · JPL
41214	1999 XZ_{3}	—	December 4, 1999	Catalina	CSS	GEF	3.7 km	MPC · JPL
41215	1999 XH_{4}	—	December 4, 1999	Catalina	CSS	·	5.5 km	MPC · JPL
41216	1999 XG_{5}	—	December 4, 1999	Catalina	CSS	·	4.9 km	MPC · JPL
41217	1999 XT_{6}	—	December 4, 1999	Catalina	CSS	·	3.9 km	MPC · JPL
41218	1999 XK_{10}	—	December 5, 1999	Catalina	CSS	·	12 km	MPC · JPL
41219	1999 XR_{11}	—	December 6, 1999	Catalina	CSS	·	7.0 km	MPC · JPL
41220	1999 XV_{12}	—	December 5, 1999	Socorro	LINEAR	GEF	3.3 km	MPC · JPL
41221	1999 XQ_{13}	—	December 5, 1999	Socorro	LINEAR	·	8.3 km	MPC · JPL
41222	1999 XH_{15}	—	December 2, 1999	Ondřejov	L. Kotková	·	5.2 km	MPC · JPL
41223	1999 XD_{16}	—	December 7, 1999	Catalina	CSS	·	7.6 km	MPC · JPL
41224	1999 XX_{17}	—	December 3, 1999	Socorro	LINEAR	·	3.9 km	MPC · JPL
41225	1999 XY_{17}	—	December 3, 1999	Socorro	LINEAR	MRX	2.5 km	MPC · JPL
41226	1999 XZ_{17}	—	December 3, 1999	Socorro	LINEAR	·	5.5 km	MPC · JPL
41227	1999 XN_{18}	—	December 3, 1999	Socorro	LINEAR	KOR	4.3 km	MPC · JPL
41228	1999 XT_{18}	—	December 3, 1999	Socorro	LINEAR	·	2.8 km	MPC · JPL
41229	1999 XB_{19}	—	December 3, 1999	Socorro	LINEAR	ADE	6.3 km	MPC · JPL
41230	1999 XE_{20}	—	December 5, 1999	Socorro	LINEAR	·	3.4 km	MPC · JPL
41231	1999 XS_{20}	—	December 5, 1999	Socorro	LINEAR	·	4.7 km	MPC · JPL
41232	1999 XK_{21}	—	December 5, 1999	Socorro	LINEAR	·	4.2 km	MPC · JPL
41233	1999 XX_{22}	—	December 6, 1999	Socorro	LINEAR	EUN	5.3 km	MPC · JPL
41234	1999 XP_{23}	—	December 6, 1999	Socorro	LINEAR	·	7.3 km	MPC · JPL
41235	1999 XB_{24}	—	December 6, 1999	Socorro	LINEAR	·	9.2 km	MPC · JPL
41236	1999 XH_{24}	—	December 6, 1999	Socorro	LINEAR	·	4.6 km	MPC · JPL
41237	1999 XM_{25}	—	December 6, 1999	Socorro	LINEAR	THM	6.3 km	MPC · JPL
41238	1999 XU_{25}	—	December 6, 1999	Socorro	LINEAR	·	5.9 km	MPC · JPL
41239	1999 XD_{26}	—	December 6, 1999	Socorro	LINEAR	EOS	6.4 km	MPC · JPL
41240	1999 XO_{26}	—	December 6, 1999	Socorro	LINEAR	·	6.4 km	MPC · JPL
41241	1999 XV_{26}	—	December 6, 1999	Socorro	LINEAR	·	2.7 km	MPC · JPL
41242	1999 XY_{26}	—	December 6, 1999	Socorro	LINEAR	KOR	3.5 km	MPC · JPL
41243	1999 XG_{29}	—	December 6, 1999	Socorro	LINEAR	EOS	4.2 km	MPC · JPL
41244	1999 XY_{30}	—	December 6, 1999	Socorro	LINEAR	·	5.0 km	MPC · JPL
41245	1999 XJ_{37}	—	December 7, 1999	Fountain Hills	C. W. Juels	·	5.1 km	MPC · JPL
41246	1999 XZ_{38}	—	December 5, 1999	Socorro	LINEAR	·	5.9 km	MPC · JPL
41247	1999 XQ_{39}	—	December 6, 1999	Socorro	LINEAR	·	6.9 km	MPC · JPL
41248	1999 XG_{40}	—	December 7, 1999	Socorro	LINEAR	·	4.8 km	MPC · JPL
41249	1999 XJ_{40}	—	December 7, 1999	Socorro	LINEAR	·	3.9 km	MPC · JPL
41250	1999 XA_{41}	—	December 7, 1999	Socorro	LINEAR	·	6.1 km	MPC · JPL
41251	1999 XD_{41}	—	December 7, 1999	Socorro	LINEAR	(1298)	6.5 km	MPC · JPL
41252	1999 XJ_{42}	—	December 7, 1999	Socorro	LINEAR	EOS	5.0 km	MPC · JPL
41253	1999 XP_{43}	—	December 7, 1999	Socorro	LINEAR	AGN	3.9 km	MPC · JPL
41254	1999 XT_{43}	—	December 7, 1999	Socorro	LINEAR	EOS	4.1 km	MPC · JPL
41255	1999 XV_{43}	—	December 7, 1999	Socorro	LINEAR	(5)	2.7 km	MPC · JPL
41256	1999 XX_{45}	—	December 7, 1999	Socorro	LINEAR	EUN	3.7 km	MPC · JPL
41257	1999 XG_{46}	—	December 7, 1999	Socorro	LINEAR	·	3.5 km	MPC · JPL
41258	1999 XB_{47}	—	December 7, 1999	Socorro	LINEAR	TEL	3.4 km	MPC · JPL
41259	1999 XH_{52}	—	December 7, 1999	Socorro	LINEAR	·	6.1 km	MPC · JPL
41260	1999 XZ_{53}	—	December 7, 1999	Socorro	LINEAR	·	4.9 km	MPC · JPL
41261	1999 XA_{54}	—	December 7, 1999	Socorro	LINEAR	KOR	4.1 km	MPC · JPL
41262	1999 XZ_{55}	—	December 7, 1999	Socorro	LINEAR	2:1J	6.9 km	MPC · JPL
41263	1999 XM_{56}	—	December 7, 1999	Socorro	LINEAR	EOS	4.0 km	MPC · JPL
41264	1999 XF_{58}	—	December 7, 1999	Socorro	LINEAR	·	9.0 km	MPC · JPL
41265	1999 XG_{58}	—	December 7, 1999	Socorro	LINEAR	·	4.0 km	MPC · JPL
41266	1999 XP_{58}	—	December 7, 1999	Socorro	LINEAR	EOS	4.5 km	MPC · JPL
41267	1999 XK_{60}	—	December 7, 1999	Socorro	LINEAR	·	7.4 km	MPC · JPL
41268	1999 XO_{64}	—	December 7, 1999	Socorro	LINEAR	L4	15 km	MPC · JPL
41269	1999 XX_{65}	—	December 7, 1999	Socorro	LINEAR	·	10 km	MPC · JPL
41270	1999 XK_{68}	—	December 7, 1999	Socorro	LINEAR	·	6.9 km	MPC · JPL
41271	1999 XQ_{71}	—	December 7, 1999	Socorro	LINEAR	·	3.6 km	MPC · JPL
41272	1999 XH_{72}	—	December 7, 1999	Socorro	LINEAR	EOS	7.2 km	MPC · JPL
41273	1999 XL_{72}	—	December 7, 1999	Socorro	LINEAR	EOS	4.9 km	MPC · JPL
41274	1999 XS_{72}	—	December 7, 1999	Socorro	LINEAR	EOS	7.3 km	MPC · JPL
41275	1999 XP_{78}	—	December 7, 1999	Socorro	LINEAR	·	6.1 km	MPC · JPL
41276	1999 XG_{83}	—	December 7, 1999	Socorro	LINEAR	·	8.4 km	MPC · JPL
41277	1999 XS_{85}	—	December 7, 1999	Socorro	LINEAR	·	6.5 km	MPC · JPL
41278	1999 XA_{90}	—	December 7, 1999	Socorro	LINEAR	HIL · 3:2 · (6124)	16 km	MPC · JPL
41279 Trentman	1999 XD_{95}	Trentman	December 8, 1999	Olathe	Robinson, L.	·	7.6 km	MPC · JPL
41280	1999 XJ_{95}	—	December 7, 1999	Oizumi	T. Kobayashi	·	4.0 km	MPC · JPL
41281	1999 XZ_{95}	—	December 9, 1999	Oizumi	T. Kobayashi	·	9.9 km	MPC · JPL
41282	1999 XO_{96}	—	December 7, 1999	Socorro	LINEAR	·	7.0 km	MPC · JPL
41283	1999 XM_{99}	—	December 7, 1999	Socorro	LINEAR	T_{j} (2.98) · 3:2	18 km	MPC · JPL
41284	1999 XP_{102}	—	December 7, 1999	Socorro	LINEAR	EOS	7.2 km	MPC · JPL
41285	1999 XM_{106}	—	December 4, 1999	Catalina	CSS	·	4.7 km	MPC · JPL
41286	1999 XN_{106}	—	December 4, 1999	Catalina	CSS	·	12 km	MPC · JPL
41287	1999 XZ_{106}	—	December 4, 1999	Catalina	CSS	·	3.1 km	MPC · JPL
41288	1999 XD_{107}	—	December 4, 1999	Catalina	CSS	·	3.7 km	MPC · JPL
41289	1999 XN_{107}	—	December 4, 1999	Catalina	CSS	·	6.6 km	MPC · JPL
41290	1999 XB_{108}	—	December 4, 1999	Catalina	CSS	URS	8.0 km	MPC · JPL
41291	1999 XE_{108}	—	December 4, 1999	Catalina	CSS	KOR	3.9 km	MPC · JPL
41292	1999 XH_{108}	—	December 4, 1999	Catalina	CSS	·	7.1 km	MPC · JPL
41293	1999 XY_{108}	—	December 4, 1999	Catalina	CSS	KOR	3.7 km	MPC · JPL
41294	1999 XH_{109}	—	December 4, 1999	Catalina	CSS	·	7.5 km	MPC · JPL
41295	1999 XM_{110}	—	December 4, 1999	Catalina	CSS	TEL	4.1 km	MPC · JPL
41296	1999 XY_{119}	—	December 5, 1999	Catalina	CSS	·	10 km	MPC · JPL
41297	1999 XE_{123}	—	December 7, 1999	Catalina	CSS	EUN	3.7 km	MPC · JPL
41298	1999 XT_{123}	—	December 7, 1999	Catalina	CSS	EOS	8.7 km	MPC · JPL
41299	1999 XY_{125}	—	December 7, 1999	Catalina	CSS	·	3.7 km	MPC · JPL
41300	1999 XZ_{126}	—	December 7, 1999	Catalina	CSS	EOS	4.9 km	MPC · JPL

== 41301–41400 ==
back to top

Designation			Discovery			Properties		Ref
Permanent	Provisional	Named after	Date	Site	Discoverer(s)	Category	Diam.	Ref
41301	1999 XP_{127}	—	December 6, 1999	Gnosca	S. Sposetti	·	8.0 km	MPC · JPL
41302	1999 XO_{129}	—	December 12, 1999	Socorro	LINEAR	VER	9.5 km	MPC · JPL
41303	1999 XP_{139}	—	December 2, 1999	Kitt Peak	Spacewatch	·	4.8 km	MPC · JPL
41304	1999 XA_{141}	—	December 2, 1999	Kitt Peak	Spacewatch	·	7.6 km	MPC · JPL
41305	1999 XK_{143}	—	December 15, 1999	Fountain Hills	C. W. Juels	·	13 km	MPC · JPL
41306	1999 XT_{146}	—	December 7, 1999	Kitt Peak	Spacewatch	·	5.2 km	MPC · JPL
41307	1999 XA_{149}	—	December 8, 1999	Kitt Peak	Spacewatch	KOR	2.7 km	MPC · JPL
41308	1999 XA_{154}	—	December 8, 1999	Socorro	LINEAR	EOS	9.9 km	MPC · JPL
41309	1999 XT_{157}	—	December 8, 1999	Socorro	LINEAR	EOS	6.3 km	MPC · JPL
41310	1999 XC_{158}	—	December 8, 1999	Socorro	LINEAR	EOS	8.8 km	MPC · JPL
41311	1999 XR_{166}	—	December 10, 1999	Socorro	LINEAR	·	12 km	MPC · JPL
41312	1999 XU_{167}	—	December 10, 1999	Socorro	LINEAR	·	9.2 km	MPC · JPL
41313	1999 XD_{168}	—	December 10, 1999	Socorro	LINEAR	EUN	4.7 km	MPC · JPL
41314	1999 XN_{168}	—	December 10, 1999	Socorro	LINEAR	GEF	5.4 km	MPC · JPL
41315	1999 XU_{168}	—	December 10, 1999	Socorro	LINEAR	·	10 km	MPC · JPL
41316	1999 XJ_{187}	—	December 12, 1999	Socorro	LINEAR	EOS · slow	9.1 km	MPC · JPL
41317	1999 XO_{191}	—	December 12, 1999	Socorro	LINEAR	·	4.9 km	MPC · JPL
41318	1999 XT_{196}	—	December 12, 1999	Socorro	LINEAR	·	6.6 km	MPC · JPL
41319	1999 XJ_{208}	—	December 13, 1999	Socorro	LINEAR	·	4.8 km	MPC · JPL
41320	1999 XJ_{209}	—	December 13, 1999	Socorro	LINEAR	EOS	7.0 km	MPC · JPL
41321	1999 XM_{209}	—	December 13, 1999	Socorro	LINEAR	·	8.7 km	MPC · JPL
41322	1999 XK_{212}	—	December 14, 1999	Socorro	LINEAR	AGN	3.9 km	MPC · JPL
41323	1999 XM_{212}	—	December 14, 1999	Socorro	LINEAR	EOS	6.9 km	MPC · JPL
41324	1999 XO_{212}	—	December 14, 1999	Socorro	LINEAR	·	3.3 km	MPC · JPL
41325	1999 XR_{212}	—	December 14, 1999	Socorro	LINEAR	EOS	5.6 km	MPC · JPL
41326	1999 XY_{212}	—	December 14, 1999	Socorro	LINEAR	·	13 km	MPC · JPL
41327	1999 XD_{217}	—	December 13, 1999	Kitt Peak	Spacewatch	THM	9.2 km	MPC · JPL
41328	1999 XP_{220}	—	December 14, 1999	Socorro	LINEAR	·	4.6 km	MPC · JPL
41329	1999 XM_{221}	—	December 15, 1999	Socorro	LINEAR	CYB	13 km	MPC · JPL
41330	1999 XU_{225}	—	December 13, 1999	Kitt Peak	Spacewatch	·	2.3 km	MPC · JPL
41331	1999 XB_{232}	—	December 9, 1999	Socorro	LINEAR	PHO	5.6 km	MPC · JPL
41332	1999 XM_{233}	—	December 3, 1999	Socorro	LINEAR	·	8.1 km	MPC · JPL
41333	1999 XL_{238}	—	December 3, 1999	Socorro	LINEAR	·	3.4 km	MPC · JPL
41334	1999 XE_{242}	—	December 13, 1999	Catalina	CSS	EOS	6.1 km	MPC · JPL
41335	1999 XL_{244}	—	December 3, 1999	Socorro	LINEAR	·	3.1 km	MPC · JPL
41336	1999 XX_{244}	—	December 4, 1999	Kitt Peak	Spacewatch	·	3.8 km	MPC · JPL
41337	1999 XN_{258}	—	December 5, 1999	Anderson Mesa	LONEOS	·	13 km	MPC · JPL
41338	1999 YF_{4}	—	December 25, 1999	Prescott	P. G. Comba	·	3.5 km	MPC · JPL
41339	1999 YR_{9}	—	December 31, 1999	Oizumi	T. Kobayashi	MRX	3.7 km	MPC · JPL
41340	1999 YO_{14}	—	December 31, 1999	Socorro	LINEAR	L4	35 km	MPC · JPL
41341	1999 YZ_{21}	—	December 30, 1999	Anderson Mesa	LONEOS	·	9.8 km	MPC · JPL
41342	1999 YC_{23}	—	December 30, 1999	Anderson Mesa	LONEOS	L4	13 km	MPC · JPL
41343	2000 AY_{9}	—	January 3, 2000	Socorro	LINEAR	EOS	5.9 km	MPC · JPL
41344	2000 AR_{16}	—	January 3, 2000	Socorro	LINEAR	CYB	12 km	MPC · JPL
41345	2000 AB_{18}	—	January 3, 2000	Socorro	LINEAR	·	10 km	MPC · JPL
41346	2000 AW_{19}	—	January 3, 2000	Socorro	LINEAR	·	8.2 km	MPC · JPL
41347	2000 AR_{22}	—	January 3, 2000	Socorro	LINEAR	EOS	6.8 km	MPC · JPL
41348	2000 AH_{23}	—	January 3, 2000	Socorro	LINEAR	·	3.2 km	MPC · JPL
41349	2000 AA_{24}	—	January 3, 2000	Socorro	LINEAR	·	12 km	MPC · JPL
41350	2000 AJ_{25}	—	January 3, 2000	Socorro	LINEAR	L4	16 km	MPC · JPL
41351	2000 AS_{27}	—	January 3, 2000	Socorro	LINEAR	3:2	15 km	MPC · JPL
41352	2000 AT_{31}	—	January 3, 2000	Socorro	LINEAR	·	14 km	MPC · JPL
41353	2000 AB_{33}	—	January 3, 2000	Socorro	LINEAR	L4	17 km	MPC · JPL
41354	2000 AW_{33}	—	January 3, 2000	Socorro	LINEAR	·	14 km	MPC · JPL
41355	2000 AF_{36}	—	January 3, 2000	Socorro	LINEAR	L4	12 km	MPC · JPL
41356	2000 AZ_{51}	—	January 4, 2000	Socorro	LINEAR	HYG	9.6 km	MPC · JPL
41357	2000 AD_{52}	—	January 4, 2000	Socorro	LINEAR	·	4.4 km	MPC · JPL
41358	2000 AJ_{54}	—	January 4, 2000	Socorro	LINEAR	·	8.8 km	MPC · JPL
41359	2000 AG_{55}	—	January 4, 2000	Socorro	LINEAR	L4	16 km	MPC · JPL
41360	2000 AN_{68}	—	January 5, 2000	Socorro	LINEAR	EOS	8.8 km	MPC · JPL
41361	2000 AO_{76}	—	January 5, 2000	Socorro	LINEAR	EOS	7.1 km	MPC · JPL
41362	2000 AJ_{81}	—	January 5, 2000	Socorro	LINEAR	EOS	6.6 km	MPC · JPL
41363	2000 AA_{90}	—	January 5, 2000	Socorro	LINEAR	SYL · CYB	14 km	MPC · JPL
41364	2000 AD_{96}	—	January 4, 2000	Socorro	LINEAR	·	2.2 km	MPC · JPL
41365	2000 AO_{98}	—	January 5, 2000	Socorro	LINEAR	T_{j} (2.99) · HIL · 3:2	14 km	MPC · JPL
41366	2000 AU_{98}	—	January 5, 2000	Socorro	LINEAR	MAR	2.7 km	MPC · JPL
41367	2000 AP_{99}	—	January 5, 2000	Socorro	LINEAR	EOS	6.5 km	MPC · JPL
41368	2000 AA_{100}	—	January 5, 2000	Socorro	LINEAR	·	6.4 km	MPC · JPL
41369	2000 AG_{100}	—	January 5, 2000	Socorro	LINEAR	·	9.7 km	MPC · JPL
41370	2000 AA_{101}	—	January 5, 2000	Socorro	LINEAR	EOS	5.4 km	MPC · JPL
41371	2000 AB_{101}	—	January 5, 2000	Socorro	LINEAR	·	8.3 km	MPC · JPL
41372	2000 AC_{101}	—	January 5, 2000	Socorro	LINEAR	EOS	5.8 km	MPC · JPL
41373	2000 AR_{101}	—	January 5, 2000	Socorro	LINEAR	·	4.4 km	MPC · JPL
41374	2000 AW_{101}	—	January 5, 2000	Socorro	LINEAR	RAF	3.4 km	MPC · JPL
41375	2000 AD_{102}	—	January 5, 2000	Socorro	LINEAR	EOS	6.1 km	MPC · JPL
41376	2000 AT_{103}	—	January 5, 2000	Socorro	LINEAR	EMA	9.3 km	MPC · JPL
41377	2000 AB_{104}	—	January 5, 2000	Socorro	LINEAR	·	9.5 km	MPC · JPL
41378	2000 AP_{105}	—	January 5, 2000	Socorro	LINEAR	·	6.9 km	MPC · JPL
41379	2000 AS_{105}	—	January 5, 2000	Socorro	LINEAR	L4	31 km	MPC · JPL
41380	2000 AM_{113}	—	January 5, 2000	Socorro	LINEAR	·	7.9 km	MPC · JPL
41381	2000 AG_{117}	—	January 5, 2000	Socorro	LINEAR	CLO	7.6 km	MPC · JPL
41382	2000 AV_{124}	—	January 5, 2000	Socorro	LINEAR	URS	10 km	MPC · JPL
41383	2000 AH_{138}	—	January 5, 2000	Socorro	LINEAR	·	14 km	MPC · JPL
41384	2000 AJ_{138}	—	January 5, 2000	Socorro	LINEAR	·	11 km	MPC · JPL
41385	2000 AQ_{138}	—	January 5, 2000	Socorro	LINEAR	·	4.5 km	MPC · JPL
41386	2000 AD_{140}	—	January 5, 2000	Socorro	LINEAR	·	6.3 km	MPC · JPL
41387	2000 AE_{140}	—	January 5, 2000	Socorro	LINEAR	·	3.8 km	MPC · JPL
41388	2000 AJ_{140}	—	January 5, 2000	Socorro	LINEAR	·	9.0 km	MPC · JPL
41389	2000 AM_{140}	—	January 5, 2000	Socorro	LINEAR	GEF	3.9 km	MPC · JPL
41390	2000 AX_{145}	—	January 7, 2000	Socorro	LINEAR	·	7.0 km	MPC · JPL
41391	2000 AX_{148}	—	January 7, 2000	Socorro	LINEAR	GEF	4.7 km	MPC · JPL
41392	2000 AA_{149}	—	January 7, 2000	Socorro	LINEAR	·	9.9 km	MPC · JPL
41393	2000 AV_{151}	—	January 8, 2000	Socorro	LINEAR	·	2.9 km	MPC · JPL
41394	2000 AW_{162}	—	January 5, 2000	Socorro	LINEAR	DOR	8.9 km	MPC · JPL
41395	2000 AY_{169}	—	January 7, 2000	Socorro	LINEAR	·	7.9 km	MPC · JPL
41396	2000 AG_{175}	—	January 7, 2000	Socorro	LINEAR	·	7.4 km	MPC · JPL
41397	2000 AS_{175}	—	January 7, 2000	Socorro	LINEAR	(1118)	20 km	MPC · JPL
41398	2000 AH_{177}	—	January 7, 2000	Socorro	LINEAR	EOS	6.5 km	MPC · JPL
41399	2000 AR_{177}	—	January 7, 2000	Socorro	LINEAR	URS	12 km	MPC · JPL
41400	2000 AR_{185}	—	January 8, 2000	Socorro	LINEAR	EUN	4.7 km	MPC · JPL

== 41401–41500 ==
back to top

Designation			Discovery			Properties		Ref
Permanent	Provisional	Named after	Date	Site	Discoverer(s)	Category	Diam.	Ref
41401	2000 AU_{186}	—	January 8, 2000	Socorro	LINEAR	EOS	7.1 km	MPC · JPL
41402	2000 AV_{186}	—	January 8, 2000	Socorro	LINEAR	EOS	7.4 km	MPC · JPL
41403	2000 AW_{186}	—	January 8, 2000	Socorro	LINEAR	EOS	11 km	MPC · JPL
41404	2000 AG_{187}	—	January 8, 2000	Socorro	LINEAR	·	3.8 km	MPC · JPL
41405	2000 AS_{187}	—	January 8, 2000	Socorro	LINEAR	·	10 km	MPC · JPL
41406	2000 AD_{188}	—	January 8, 2000	Socorro	LINEAR	·	16 km	MPC · JPL
41407	2000 AL_{188}	—	January 8, 2000	Socorro	LINEAR	·	5.0 km	MPC · JPL
41408	2000 AV_{196}	—	January 8, 2000	Socorro	LINEAR	·	13 km	MPC · JPL
41409	2000 AW_{199}	—	January 9, 2000	Socorro	LINEAR	·	6.2 km	MPC · JPL
41410	2000 AD_{200}	—	January 9, 2000	Socorro	LINEAR	WAT	6.4 km	MPC · JPL
41411	2000 AK_{200}	—	January 9, 2000	Socorro	LINEAR	·	2.9 km	MPC · JPL
41412	2000 AO_{200}	—	January 9, 2000	Socorro	LINEAR	MAR	3.3 km	MPC · JPL
41413	2000 AF_{210}	—	January 5, 2000	Kitt Peak	Spacewatch	·	5.6 km	MPC · JPL
41414	2000 AC_{215}	—	January 7, 2000	Kitt Peak	Spacewatch	·	4.4 km	MPC · JPL
41415	2000 AX_{230}	—	January 4, 2000	Anderson Mesa	LONEOS	·	7.7 km	MPC · JPL
41416	2000 AF_{231}	—	January 4, 2000	Anderson Mesa	LONEOS	·	5.5 km	MPC · JPL
41417	2000 AL_{233}	—	January 4, 2000	Kitt Peak	Spacewatch	L4	13 km	MPC · JPL
41418	2000 AR_{233}	—	January 5, 2000	Socorro	LINEAR	BRA	6.0 km	MPC · JPL
41419	2000 AW_{234}	—	January 5, 2000	Socorro	LINEAR	3:2	12 km	MPC · JPL
41420	2000 AQ_{240}	—	January 7, 2000	Anderson Mesa	LONEOS	EUN	3.1 km	MPC · JPL
41421	2000 AZ_{240}	—	January 7, 2000	Anderson Mesa	LONEOS	·	4.4 km	MPC · JPL
41422	2000 CB_{5}	—	February 2, 2000	Socorro	LINEAR	·	8.9 km	MPC · JPL
41423	2000 CU_{24}	—	February 2, 2000	Socorro	LINEAR	·	2.3 km	MPC · JPL
41424	2000 CK_{40}	—	February 4, 2000	Socorro	LINEAR	H	3.0 km	MPC · JPL
41425	2000 CE_{77}	—	February 10, 2000	Višnjan Observatory	K. Korlević	V	2.1 km	MPC · JPL
41426	2000 CJ_{140}	—	February 5, 2000	Kitt Peak	Spacewatch	L4	12 km	MPC · JPL
41427	2000 DY_{4}	—	February 28, 2000	Socorro	LINEAR	L4	18 km	MPC · JPL
41428	2000 EL_{85}	—	March 8, 2000	Socorro	LINEAR	V	2.8 km	MPC · JPL
41429	2000 GE_{2}	—	April 3, 2000	Socorro	LINEAR	APO · PHA	200 m	MPC · JPL
41430	2000 GN_{4}	—	April 4, 2000	Socorro	LINEAR	PHO	4.8 km	MPC · JPL
41431	2000 GY_{6}	—	April 4, 2000	Socorro	LINEAR	·	2.0 km	MPC · JPL
41432	2000 GE_{35}	—	April 5, 2000	Socorro	LINEAR	JUN	2.8 km	MPC · JPL
41433	2000 GY_{51}	—	April 5, 2000	Socorro	LINEAR	·	2.6 km	MPC · JPL
41434	2000 GB_{82}	—	April 7, 2000	Socorro	LINEAR	·	1.2 km	MPC · JPL
41435	2000 GQ_{89}	—	April 4, 2000	Socorro	LINEAR	·	4.5 km	MPC · JPL
41436	2000 GJ_{95}	—	April 6, 2000	Socorro	LINEAR	MAR	4.1 km	MPC · JPL
41437	2000 GT_{122}	—	April 11, 2000	Fountain Hills	C. W. Juels	EUN	6.3 km	MPC · JPL
41438	2000 GG_{124}	—	April 7, 2000	Socorro	LINEAR	PHO	4.5 km	MPC · JPL
41439	2000 GO_{134}	—	April 8, 2000	Socorro	LINEAR	·	2.5 km	MPC · JPL
41440	2000 HZ_{23}	—	April 27, 2000	Anderson Mesa	LONEOS	AMO	380 m	MPC · JPL
41441	2000 HK_{25}	—	April 24, 2000	Anderson Mesa	LONEOS	·	4.0 km	MPC · JPL
41442	2000 JS_{51}	—	May 9, 2000	Socorro	LINEAR	·	3.8 km	MPC · JPL
41443	2000 JD_{73}	—	May 2, 2000	Anderson Mesa	LONEOS	slow	3.4 km	MPC · JPL
41444	2000 JK_{76}	—	May 6, 2000	Socorro	LINEAR	EOS	8.8 km	MPC · JPL
41445	2000 KF_{56}	—	May 27, 2000	Socorro	LINEAR	NYS	3.7 km	MPC · JPL
41446	2000 LW	—	June 1, 2000	Kitt Peak	Spacewatch	GEF	4.0 km	MPC · JPL
41447	2000 LK_{4}	—	June 4, 2000	Socorro	LINEAR	·	4.2 km	MPC · JPL
41448	2000 LJ_{12}	—	June 4, 2000	Socorro	LINEAR	GAL	6.7 km	MPC · JPL
41449	2000 LN_{12}	—	June 5, 2000	Socorro	LINEAR	·	3.7 km	MPC · JPL
41450 Medkeff	2000 LF_{15}	Medkeff	June 1, 2000	Anza	M. Collins, White, M.	NYS	2.5 km	MPC · JPL
41451	2000 LJ_{24}	—	June 1, 2000	Socorro	LINEAR	EUN	4.3 km	MPC · JPL
41452	2000 LD_{29}	—	June 9, 2000	Anderson Mesa	LONEOS	·	3.4 km	MPC · JPL
41453	2000 MJ_{4}	—	June 25, 2000	Socorro	LINEAR	EUN	5.6 km	MPC · JPL
41454	2000 MQ_{5}	—	June 26, 2000	Socorro	LINEAR	·	1.9 km	MPC · JPL
41455	2000 NC	—	July 1, 2000	Prescott	P. G. Comba	·	4.6 km	MPC · JPL
41456	2000 NT	—	July 3, 2000	Prescott	P. G. Comba	·	5.0 km	MPC · JPL
41457	2000 ND_{2}	—	July 5, 2000	Kitt Peak	Spacewatch	·	2.5 km	MPC · JPL
41458 Ramanjooloo	2000 NN_{14}	Ramanjooloo	July 5, 2000	Anderson Mesa	LONEOS	ERI	4.2 km	MPC · JPL
41459	2000 NO_{20}	—	July 6, 2000	Kitt Peak	Spacewatch	·	2.5 km	MPC · JPL
41460	2000 NC_{28}	—	July 3, 2000	Socorro	LINEAR	·	10 km	MPC · JPL
41461	2000 ON	—	July 23, 2000	Socorro	LINEAR	T_{j} (2.81)	6.8 km	MPC · JPL
41462	2000 OJ_{13}	—	July 23, 2000	Socorro	LINEAR	·	8.0 km	MPC · JPL
41463	2000 OG_{21}	—	July 31, 2000	Socorro	LINEAR	·	3.3 km	MPC · JPL
41464	2000 OL_{22}	—	July 31, 2000	Socorro	LINEAR	H	1.3 km	MPC · JPL
41465	2000 OV_{22}	—	July 23, 2000	Socorro	LINEAR	·	3.8 km	MPC · JPL
41466	2000 OW_{24}	—	July 23, 2000	Socorro	LINEAR	·	4.1 km	MPC · JPL
41467	2000 OG_{29}	—	July 30, 2000	Socorro	LINEAR	·	3.5 km	MPC · JPL
41468	2000 OS_{46}	—	July 31, 2000	Socorro	LINEAR	·	3.3 km	MPC · JPL
41469	2000 OT_{49}	—	July 31, 2000	Socorro	LINEAR	(5)	3.2 km	MPC · JPL
41470	2000 OK_{50}	—	July 31, 2000	Socorro	LINEAR	·	2.9 km	MPC · JPL
41471	2000 OC_{51}	—	July 30, 2000	Socorro	LINEAR	·	2.2 km	MPC · JPL
41472	2000 OA_{59}	—	July 29, 2000	Anderson Mesa	LONEOS	EUN	3.8 km	MPC · JPL
41473	2000 PU_{9}	—	August 9, 2000	Ondřejov	L. Kotková	NYS	2.4 km	MPC · JPL
41474	2000 PE_{13}	—	August 1, 2000	Socorro	LINEAR	·	2.3 km	MPC · JPL
41475	2000 PR_{13}	—	August 1, 2000	Socorro	LINEAR	·	3.0 km	MPC · JPL
41476	2000 PC_{14}	—	August 1, 2000	Socorro	LINEAR	(5)	2.5 km	MPC · JPL
41477	2000 PP_{26}	—	August 5, 2000	Haleakala	NEAT	·	3.5 km	MPC · JPL
41478	2000 PR_{28}	—	August 3, 2000	Socorro	LINEAR	V	3.9 km	MPC · JPL
41479	2000 QQ_{27}	—	August 24, 2000	Socorro	LINEAR	·	2.7 km	MPC · JPL
41480	2000 QZ_{29}	—	August 25, 2000	Socorro	LINEAR	HYG	9.0 km	MPC · JPL
41481 Musashifuchu	2000 QE_{35}	Musashifuchu	August 28, 2000	Bisei SG Center	BATTeRS	·	2.8 km	MPC · JPL
41482	2000 QF_{37}	—	August 24, 2000	Socorro	LINEAR	·	4.9 km	MPC · JPL
41483	2000 QD_{41}	—	August 24, 2000	Socorro	LINEAR	·	5.4 km	MPC · JPL
41484	2000 QB_{44}	—	August 24, 2000	Socorro	LINEAR	·	2.2 km	MPC · JPL
41485	2000 QF_{51}	—	August 24, 2000	Socorro	LINEAR	·	2.2 km	MPC · JPL
41486	2000 QQ_{62}	—	August 28, 2000	Socorro	LINEAR	·	6.3 km	MPC · JPL
41487	2000 QL_{64}	—	August 28, 2000	Socorro	LINEAR	fast	3.3 km	MPC · JPL
41488 Sindbad	2000 QE_{71}	Sindbad	August 29, 2000	Reedy Creek	J. Broughton	HIL · 3:2	18 km	MPC · JPL
41489	2000 QL_{73}	—	August 24, 2000	Socorro	LINEAR	·	1.3 km	MPC · JPL
41490	2000 QX_{75}	—	August 24, 2000	Socorro	LINEAR	·	4.0 km	MPC · JPL
41491	2000 QK_{80}	—	August 24, 2000	Socorro	LINEAR	·	2.1 km	MPC · JPL
41492	2000 QC_{89}	—	August 25, 2000	Socorro	LINEAR	·	2.9 km	MPC · JPL
41493	2000 QO_{101}	—	August 28, 2000	Socorro	LINEAR	·	3.1 km	MPC · JPL
41494	2000 QX_{111}	—	August 24, 2000	Socorro	LINEAR	·	2.4 km	MPC · JPL
41495	2000 QH_{117}	—	August 26, 2000	Socorro	LINEAR	·	2.5 km	MPC · JPL
41496	2000 QB_{118}	—	August 25, 2000	Socorro	LINEAR	·	2.4 km	MPC · JPL
41497	2000 QC_{128}	—	August 24, 2000	Socorro	LINEAR	·	2.5 km	MPC · JPL
41498	2000 QK_{128}	—	August 24, 2000	Socorro	LINEAR	·	3.4 km	MPC · JPL
41499	2000 QH_{143}	—	August 31, 2000	Socorro	LINEAR	·	6.3 km	MPC · JPL
41500	2000 QO_{143}	—	August 31, 2000	Socorro	LINEAR	·	4.3 km	MPC · JPL

== 41501–41600 ==
back to top

Designation			Discovery			Properties		Ref
Permanent	Provisional	Named after	Date	Site	Discoverer(s)	Category	Diam.	Ref
41501	2000 QA_{146}	—	August 31, 2000	Socorro	LINEAR	·	2.8 km	MPC · JPL
41502 Denchukun	2000 QK_{147}	Denchukun	August 23, 2000	Bisei SG Center	BATTeRS	·	2.8 km	MPC · JPL
41503	2000 QG_{148}	—	August 26, 2000	Kvistaberg	Uppsala-DLR Asteroid Survey	H	1.3 km	MPC · JPL
41504	2000 QY_{148}	—	August 29, 2000	Siding Spring	R. H. McNaught	H	1.1 km	MPC · JPL
41505	2000 QP_{150}	—	August 25, 2000	Socorro	LINEAR	·	3.6 km	MPC · JPL
41506	2000 QD_{151}	—	August 25, 2000	Socorro	LINEAR	·	2.9 km	MPC · JPL
41507	2000 QU_{157}	—	August 31, 2000	Socorro	LINEAR	·	8.7 km	MPC · JPL
41508	2000 QY_{160}	—	August 31, 2000	Socorro	LINEAR	EOS · fast	5.0 km	MPC · JPL
41509	2000 QL_{169}	—	August 31, 2000	Socorro	LINEAR	·	3.3 km	MPC · JPL
41510	2000 QU_{171}	—	August 31, 2000	Socorro	LINEAR	MAR	4.8 km	MPC · JPL
41511	2000 QC_{174}	—	August 31, 2000	Socorro	LINEAR	·	6.7 km	MPC · JPL
41512	2000 QV_{179}	—	August 31, 2000	Socorro	LINEAR	KOR	2.7 km	MPC · JPL
41513	2000 QL_{180}	—	August 31, 2000	Socorro	LINEAR	·	4.1 km	MPC · JPL
41514	2000 QR_{180}	—	August 31, 2000	Socorro	LINEAR	DOR · slow	9.8 km	MPC · JPL
41515	2000 QL_{181}	—	August 31, 2000	Socorro	LINEAR	·	1.9 km	MPC · JPL
41516	2000 QN_{181}	—	August 31, 2000	Socorro	LINEAR	EUN	4.1 km	MPC · JPL
41517	2000 QK_{182}	—	August 31, 2000	Socorro	LINEAR	·	3.3 km	MPC · JPL
41518	2000 QD_{196}	—	August 28, 2000	Socorro	LINEAR	·	7.0 km	MPC · JPL
41519	2000 QH_{196}	—	August 28, 2000	Socorro	LINEAR	·	3.8 km	MPC · JPL
41520	2000 QG_{207}	—	August 31, 2000	Socorro	LINEAR	EUN	2.4 km	MPC · JPL
41521	2000 QL_{207}	—	August 31, 2000	Socorro	LINEAR	·	3.2 km	MPC · JPL
41522	2000 QX_{211}	—	August 31, 2000	Socorro	LINEAR	·	3.6 km	MPC · JPL
41523	2000 QD_{217}	—	August 31, 2000	Socorro	LINEAR	·	4.6 km	MPC · JPL
41524	2000 QU_{217}	—	August 31, 2000	Socorro	LINEAR	EOS	5.5 km	MPC · JPL
41525	2000 QP_{218}	—	August 20, 2000	Kitt Peak	Spacewatch	NYS ·	3.8 km	MPC · JPL
41526	2000 QW_{221}	—	August 21, 2000	Anderson Mesa	LONEOS	·	2.9 km	MPC · JPL
41527	2000 QX_{221}	—	August 21, 2000	Anderson Mesa	LONEOS	·	2.5 km	MPC · JPL
41528	2000 RN_{4}	—	September 1, 2000	Socorro	LINEAR	·	3.9 km	MPC · JPL
41529	2000 RC_{6}	—	September 1, 2000	Socorro	LINEAR	·	3.4 km	MPC · JPL
41530	2000 RD_{9}	—	September 1, 2000	Socorro	LINEAR	NYS	2.4 km	MPC · JPL
41531	2000 RN_{9}	—	September 1, 2000	Socorro	LINEAR	·	3.3 km	MPC · JPL
41532	2000 RO_{9}	—	September 1, 2000	Socorro	LINEAR	(5)	2.8 km	MPC · JPL
41533	2000 RV_{9}	—	September 1, 2000	Socorro	LINEAR	NYS	3.7 km	MPC · JPL
41534	2000 RX_{9}	—	September 1, 2000	Socorro	LINEAR	V	2.8 km	MPC · JPL
41535	2000 RL_{10}	—	September 1, 2000	Socorro	LINEAR	·	4.5 km	MPC · JPL
41536	2000 RJ_{15}	—	September 1, 2000	Socorro	LINEAR	·	2.4 km	MPC · JPL
41537	2000 RS_{15}	—	September 1, 2000	Socorro	LINEAR	·	2.2 km	MPC · JPL
41538	2000 RC_{30}	—	September 1, 2000	Socorro	LINEAR	(194)	4.7 km	MPC · JPL
41539	2000 RA_{32}	—	September 1, 2000	Socorro	LINEAR	·	2.2 km	MPC · JPL
41540	2000 RT_{38}	—	September 4, 2000	Socorro	LINEAR	·	2.8 km	MPC · JPL
41541	2000 RV_{38}	—	September 5, 2000	Socorro	LINEAR	·	2.0 km	MPC · JPL
41542	2000 RZ_{38}	—	September 5, 2000	Socorro	LINEAR	·	3.4 km	MPC · JPL
41543	2000 RU_{40}	—	September 3, 2000	Socorro	LINEAR	EUN	4.6 km	MPC · JPL
41544	2000 RD_{41}	—	September 3, 2000	Socorro	LINEAR	·	5.2 km	MPC · JPL
41545	2000 RA_{43}	—	September 3, 2000	Socorro	LINEAR	·	7.2 km	MPC · JPL
41546	2000 RZ_{45}	—	September 3, 2000	Socorro	LINEAR	(2076)	3.2 km	MPC · JPL
41547	2000 RA_{46}	—	September 3, 2000	Socorro	LINEAR	·	2.6 km	MPC · JPL
41548	2000 RG_{46}	—	September 3, 2000	Socorro	LINEAR	(5)	6.5 km	MPC · JPL
41549	2000 RN_{46}	—	September 3, 2000	Socorro	LINEAR	·	2.8 km	MPC · JPL
41550	2000 RO_{46}	—	September 3, 2000	Socorro	LINEAR	·	3.7 km	MPC · JPL
41551	2000 RN_{50}	—	September 5, 2000	Socorro	LINEAR	·	2.0 km	MPC · JPL
41552	2000 RS_{52}	—	September 1, 2000	Socorro	LINEAR	·	2.5 km	MPC · JPL
41553	2000 RT_{52}	—	September 1, 2000	Socorro	LINEAR	·	2.7 km	MPC · JPL
41554	2000 RH_{53}	—	September 5, 2000	Višnjan Observatory	K. Korlević	·	4.8 km	MPC · JPL
41555	2000 RT_{53}	—	September 1, 2000	Socorro	LINEAR	·	2.8 km	MPC · JPL
41556	2000 RC_{54}	—	September 1, 2000	Socorro	LINEAR	·	3.0 km	MPC · JPL
41557	2000 RJ_{54}	—	September 1, 2000	Socorro	LINEAR	·	3.1 km	MPC · JPL
41558	2000 RG_{57}	—	September 7, 2000	Kitt Peak	Spacewatch	V	1.7 km	MPC · JPL
41559	2000 RD_{60}	—	September 8, 2000	Višnjan Observatory	K. Korlević	slow	3.0 km	MPC · JPL
41560	2000 RF_{66}	—	September 1, 2000	Socorro	LINEAR	·	2.0 km	MPC · JPL
41561	2000 RQ_{66}	—	September 1, 2000	Socorro	LINEAR	·	3.2 km	MPC · JPL
41562	2000 RR_{67}	—	September 1, 2000	Socorro	LINEAR	·	3.5 km	MPC · JPL
41563	2000 RL_{71}	—	September 2, 2000	Socorro	LINEAR	(5)	2.3 km	MPC · JPL
41564	2000 RX_{71}	—	September 2, 2000	Socorro	LINEAR	·	2.3 km	MPC · JPL
41565	2000 RJ_{72}	—	September 2, 2000	Socorro	LINEAR	·	2.8 km	MPC · JPL
41566	2000 RU_{72}	—	September 2, 2000	Socorro	LINEAR	·	2.0 km	MPC · JPL
41567	2000 RN_{73}	—	September 2, 2000	Socorro	LINEAR	·	11 km	MPC · JPL
41568	2000 RU_{73}	—	September 2, 2000	Socorro	LINEAR	V	1.9 km	MPC · JPL
41569	2000 RC_{74}	—	September 2, 2000	Socorro	LINEAR	·	3.1 km	MPC · JPL
41570	2000 RW_{75}	—	September 3, 2000	Socorro	LINEAR	V	2.0 km	MPC · JPL
41571	2000 RT_{81}	—	September 1, 2000	Socorro	LINEAR	·	3.1 km	MPC · JPL
41572	2000 RL_{92}	—	September 3, 2000	Socorro	LINEAR	slow	2.2 km	MPC · JPL
41573 Miriamrobbins	2000 RB_{99}	Miriamrobbins	September 5, 2000	Anderson Mesa	LONEOS	·	5.3 km	MPC · JPL
41574	2000 SQ_{1}	—	September 19, 2000	Socorro	LINEAR	H	1.6 km	MPC · JPL
41575	2000 ST_{1}	—	September 20, 2000	Desert Beaver	W. K. Y. Yeung	(2076)	2.1 km	MPC · JPL
41576	2000 SF_{2}	—	September 20, 2000	Socorro	LINEAR	·	10 km	MPC · JPL
41577	2000 SV_{2}	—	September 20, 2000	Socorro	LINEAR	H	2.5 km	MPC · JPL
41578	2000 SE_{3}	—	September 20, 2000	Socorro	LINEAR	H	1.4 km	MPC · JPL
41579	2000 SG_{20}	—	September 23, 2000	Socorro	LINEAR	V	2.1 km	MPC · JPL
41580	2000 SV_{22}	—	September 20, 2000	Haleakala	NEAT	EUN	3.4 km	MPC · JPL
41581	2000 SY_{22}	—	September 25, 2000	Višnjan Observatory	K. Korlević	·	2.6 km	MPC · JPL
41582	2000 SL_{27}	—	September 23, 2000	Socorro	LINEAR	·	5.7 km	MPC · JPL
41583	2000 SP_{34}	—	September 24, 2000	Socorro	LINEAR	·	12 km	MPC · JPL
41584	2000 SL_{35}	—	September 24, 2000	Socorro	LINEAR	KOR	2.7 km	MPC · JPL
41585	2000 ST_{37}	—	September 24, 2000	Socorro	LINEAR	HYG	8.2 km	MPC · JPL
41586	2000 SH_{38}	—	September 24, 2000	Socorro	LINEAR	V	1.2 km	MPC · JPL
41587	2000 SX_{38}	—	September 24, 2000	Socorro	LINEAR	·	2.6 km	MPC · JPL
41588	2000 SC_{46}	—	September 22, 2000	Socorro	LINEAR	·	5.3 km	MPC · JPL
41589	2000 SJ_{46}	—	September 22, 2000	Socorro	LINEAR	MAR	5.4 km	MPC · JPL
41590	2000 SZ_{50}	—	September 23, 2000	Socorro	LINEAR	·	4.7 km	MPC · JPL
41591	2000 SL_{52}	—	September 23, 2000	Socorro	LINEAR	EUN	5.0 km	MPC · JPL
41592	2000 ST_{53}	—	September 24, 2000	Socorro	LINEAR	AGN	3.3 km	MPC · JPL
41593	2000 SH_{58}	—	September 24, 2000	Socorro	LINEAR	KOR	2.7 km	MPC · JPL
41594	2000 SG_{63}	—	September 24, 2000	Socorro	LINEAR	·	4.8 km	MPC · JPL
41595	2000 SV_{66}	—	September 24, 2000	Socorro	LINEAR	NYS	3.0 km	MPC · JPL
41596	2000 SW_{67}	—	September 24, 2000	Socorro	LINEAR	EUN	2.5 km	MPC · JPL
41597	2000 ST_{72}	—	September 24, 2000	Socorro	LINEAR	·	3.5 km	MPC · JPL
41598	2000 SL_{74}	—	September 24, 2000	Socorro	LINEAR	·	3.3 km	MPC · JPL
41599	2000 SV_{75}	—	September 24, 2000	Socorro	LINEAR	·	4.3 km	MPC · JPL
41600	2000 SJ_{76}	—	September 24, 2000	Socorro	LINEAR	·	2.4 km	MPC · JPL

== 41601–41700 ==
back to top

Designation			Discovery			Properties		Ref
Permanent	Provisional	Named after	Date	Site	Discoverer(s)	Category	Diam.	Ref
41601	2000 SH_{78}	—	September 24, 2000	Socorro	LINEAR	·	2.3 km	MPC · JPL
41602	2000 SA_{81}	—	September 24, 2000	Socorro	LINEAR	·	4.1 km	MPC · JPL
41603	2000 SN_{102}	—	September 24, 2000	Socorro	LINEAR	·	1.6 km	MPC · JPL
41604	2000 SO_{104}	—	September 24, 2000	Socorro	LINEAR	·	2.5 km	MPC · JPL
41605	2000 SV_{106}	—	September 24, 2000	Socorro	LINEAR	·	1.4 km	MPC · JPL
41606	2000 SO_{108}	—	September 24, 2000	Socorro	LINEAR	·	2.2 km	MPC · JPL
41607	2000 SJ_{113}	—	September 24, 2000	Socorro	LINEAR	·	3.1 km	MPC · JPL
41608	2000 SS_{114}	—	September 24, 2000	Socorro	LINEAR	·	4.6 km	MPC · JPL
41609	2000 SR_{117}	—	September 24, 2000	Socorro	LINEAR	slow?	2.6 km	MPC · JPL
41610	2000 SR_{119}	—	September 24, 2000	Socorro	LINEAR	·	1.8 km	MPC · JPL
41611	2000 SY_{120}	—	September 24, 2000	Socorro	LINEAR	·	2.9 km	MPC · JPL
41612	2000 SO_{124}	—	September 24, 2000	Socorro	LINEAR	·	8.3 km	MPC · JPL
41613	2000 SP_{144}	—	September 24, 2000	Socorro	LINEAR	HYG	8.5 km	MPC · JPL
41614	2000 SX_{145}	—	September 24, 2000	Socorro	LINEAR	·	2.0 km	MPC · JPL
41615	2000 SM_{149}	—	September 24, 2000	Socorro	LINEAR	·	1.9 km	MPC · JPL
41616	2000 SP_{149}	—	September 24, 2000	Socorro	LINEAR	·	2.0 km	MPC · JPL
41617	2000 SK_{151}	—	September 24, 2000	Socorro	LINEAR	·	4.0 km	MPC · JPL
41618	2000 SU_{151}	—	September 24, 2000	Socorro	LINEAR	NYS	3.9 km	MPC · JPL
41619	2000 SM_{153}	—	September 24, 2000	Socorro	LINEAR	·	2.0 km	MPC · JPL
41620	2000 SU_{160}	—	September 27, 2000	Socorro	LINEAR	·	4.0 km	MPC · JPL
41621	2000 SY_{161}	—	September 20, 2000	Haleakala	NEAT	·	5.0 km	MPC · JPL
41622	2000 SP_{166}	—	September 23, 2000	Socorro	LINEAR	·	3.2 km	MPC · JPL
41623	2000 SN_{167}	—	September 23, 2000	Socorro	LINEAR	JUN	9.5 km	MPC · JPL
41624	2000 SU_{167}	—	September 23, 2000	Socorro	LINEAR	·	2.7 km	MPC · JPL
41625	2000 SA_{168}	—	September 23, 2000	Socorro	LINEAR	·	4.1 km	MPC · JPL
41626	2000 SQ_{170}	—	September 24, 2000	Socorro	LINEAR	·	4.3 km	MPC · JPL
41627	2000 SK_{171}	—	September 24, 2000	Socorro	LINEAR	·	6.4 km	MPC · JPL
41628	2000 SW_{176}	—	September 28, 2000	Socorro	LINEAR	V	1.6 km	MPC · JPL
41629	2000 SA_{177}	—	September 28, 2000	Socorro	LINEAR	·	6.0 km	MPC · JPL
41630	2000 SM_{185}	—	September 21, 2000	Kitt Peak	Spacewatch	NYS	2.5 km	MPC · JPL
41631	2000 SN_{185}	—	September 21, 2000	Kitt Peak	Spacewatch	·	1.7 km	MPC · JPL
41632	2000 SL_{204}	—	September 24, 2000	Socorro	LINEAR	KOR	3.1 km	MPC · JPL
41633	2000 SR_{216}	—	September 26, 2000	Socorro	LINEAR	V	1.7 km	MPC · JPL
41634	2000 SO_{218}	—	September 26, 2000	Socorro	LINEAR	·	3.0 km	MPC · JPL
41635	2000 SE_{220}	—	September 26, 2000	Socorro	LINEAR	·	6.2 km	MPC · JPL
41636	2000 SZ_{220}	—	September 26, 2000	Socorro	LINEAR	·	4.1 km	MPC · JPL
41637	2000 SA_{225}	—	September 27, 2000	Socorro	LINEAR	·	3.0 km	MPC · JPL
41638	2000 SS_{225}	—	September 27, 2000	Socorro	LINEAR	·	3.3 km	MPC · JPL
41639	2000 SD_{227}	—	September 27, 2000	Socorro	LINEAR	·	4.1 km	MPC · JPL
41640	2000 SJ_{227}	—	September 27, 2000	Socorro	LINEAR	·	6.2 km	MPC · JPL
41641	2000 SV_{229}	—	September 28, 2000	Socorro	LINEAR	NYS	3.1 km	MPC · JPL
41642	2000 SK_{230}	—	September 28, 2000	Socorro	LINEAR	·	2.6 km	MPC · JPL
41643	2000 SH_{268}	—	September 27, 2000	Socorro	LINEAR	·	1.8 km	MPC · JPL
41644	2000 SC_{269}	—	September 27, 2000	Socorro	LINEAR	·	7.2 km	MPC · JPL
41645	2000 SD_{269}	—	September 27, 2000	Socorro	LINEAR	·	3.2 km	MPC · JPL
41646	2000 SJ_{273}	—	September 28, 2000	Socorro	LINEAR	·	1.6 km	MPC · JPL
41647	2000 ST_{275}	—	September 28, 2000	Socorro	LINEAR	·	2.5 km	MPC · JPL
41648	2000 SP_{276}	—	September 30, 2000	Socorro	LINEAR	RAF	2.6 km	MPC · JPL
41649	2000 SA_{279}	—	September 30, 2000	Socorro	LINEAR	·	3.6 km	MPC · JPL
41650	2000 SU_{280}	—	September 29, 2000	Haleakala	NEAT	·	4.9 km	MPC · JPL
41651	2000 ST_{293}	—	September 27, 2000	Socorro	LINEAR	·	5.9 km	MPC · JPL
41652	2000 SA_{294}	—	September 27, 2000	Socorro	LINEAR	·	5.7 km	MPC · JPL
41653	2000 SC_{294}	—	September 27, 2000	Socorro	LINEAR	·	2.5 km	MPC · JPL
41654	2000 SE_{295}	—	September 27, 2000	Socorro	LINEAR	·	3.3 km	MPC · JPL
41655	2000 SJ_{302}	—	September 28, 2000	Socorro	LINEAR	·	1.8 km	MPC · JPL
41656	2000 SH_{303}	—	September 28, 2000	Socorro	LINEAR	(5)	2.1 km	MPC · JPL
41657	2000 SN_{308}	—	September 30, 2000	Socorro	LINEAR	·	4.8 km	MPC · JPL
41658	2000 SP_{319}	—	September 26, 2000	Socorro	LINEAR	EUN	5.0 km	MPC · JPL
41659	2000 SP_{358}	—	September 24, 2000	Haleakala	NEAT	·	3.6 km	MPC · JPL
41660	2000 SV_{362}	—	September 20, 2000	Socorro	LINEAR	H	1.7 km	MPC · JPL
41661 Heathercraig	2000 SK_{369}	Heathercraig	September 22, 2000	Anderson Mesa	LONEOS	·	1.9 km	MPC · JPL
41662	2000 TB	—	October 1, 2000	Desert Beaver	W. K. Y. Yeung	NYS	3.4 km	MPC · JPL
41663	2000 TK_{16}	—	October 1, 2000	Socorro	LINEAR	·	1.5 km	MPC · JPL
41664	2000 TR_{16}	—	October 1, 2000	Socorro	LINEAR	·	2.2 km	MPC · JPL
41665	2000 TH_{18}	—	October 1, 2000	Socorro	LINEAR	·	1.7 km	MPC · JPL
41666	2000 TQ_{18}	—	October 1, 2000	Socorro	LINEAR	MAS	1.8 km	MPC · JPL
41667	2000 TE_{19}	—	October 1, 2000	Socorro	LINEAR	ERI	5.5 km	MPC · JPL
41668	2000 TP_{25}	—	October 2, 2000	Socorro	LINEAR	·	3.8 km	MPC · JPL
41669	2000 TW_{28}	—	October 6, 2000	Fountain Hills	C. W. Juels	·	2.6 km	MPC · JPL
41670	2000 TC_{29}	—	October 3, 2000	Socorro	LINEAR	·	11 km	MPC · JPL
41671 Benhardesty	2000 TF_{34}	Benhardesty	October 2, 2000	Anderson Mesa	LONEOS	TIR	6.8 km	MPC · JPL
41672	2000 TX_{36}	—	October 15, 2000	Fountain Hills	C. W. Juels	H	2.5 km	MPC · JPL
41673	2000 TU_{39}	—	October 1, 2000	Socorro	LINEAR	EUN	2.8 km	MPC · JPL
41674	2000 TV_{62}	—	October 2, 2000	Socorro	LINEAR	·	2.3 km	MPC · JPL
41675	2000 UZ_{1}	—	October 22, 2000	Višnjan Observatory	K. Korlević	·	5.2 km	MPC · JPL
41676	2000 UR_{2}	—	October 24, 2000	Desert Beaver	W. K. Y. Yeung	·	4.0 km	MPC · JPL
41677	2000 UD_{7}	—	October 24, 2000	Socorro	LINEAR	·	5.3 km	MPC · JPL
41678	2000 UV_{7}	—	October 24, 2000	Socorro	LINEAR	MAS	2.2 km	MPC · JPL
41679	2000 UC_{8}	—	October 24, 2000	Socorro	LINEAR	·	5.3 km	MPC · JPL
41680	2000 UY_{8}	—	October 24, 2000	Socorro	LINEAR	·	6.6 km	MPC · JPL
41681	2000 UA_{10}	—	October 24, 2000	Socorro	LINEAR	·	2.8 km	MPC · JPL
41682	2000 UP_{10}	—	October 24, 2000	Socorro	LINEAR	VER	8.8 km	MPC · JPL
41683	2000 UZ_{14}	—	October 25, 2000	Socorro	LINEAR	·	2.4 km	MPC · JPL
41684	2000 UL_{15}	—	October 25, 2000	Desert Beaver	W. K. Y. Yeung	·	4.7 km	MPC · JPL
41685	2000 UG_{16}	—	October 29, 2000	Socorro	LINEAR	H	1.7 km	MPC · JPL
41686	2000 UN_{16}	—	October 29, 2000	Fountain Hills	C. W. Juels	·	4.3 km	MPC · JPL
41687	2000 UY_{16}	—	October 30, 2000	Oaxaca	Roe, J. M.	·	2.6 km	MPC · JPL
41688	2000 UV_{18}	—	October 25, 2000	Socorro	LINEAR	EOS	5.6 km	MPC · JPL
41689	2000 UW_{18}	—	October 25, 2000	Socorro	LINEAR	·	2.3 km	MPC · JPL
41690	2000 UR_{19}	—	October 29, 2000	Socorro	LINEAR	·	3.8 km	MPC · JPL
41691	2000 UF_{25}	—	October 24, 2000	Socorro	LINEAR	·	2.6 km	MPC · JPL
41692	2000 UC_{27}	—	October 24, 2000	Socorro	LINEAR	·	2.0 km	MPC · JPL
41693	2000 UU_{39}	—	October 24, 2000	Socorro	LINEAR	·	2.3 km	MPC · JPL
41694	2000 UT_{41}	—	October 24, 2000	Socorro	LINEAR	·	5.7 km	MPC · JPL
41695	2000 UN_{43}	—	October 24, 2000	Socorro	LINEAR	·	2.7 km	MPC · JPL
41696	2000 UF_{45}	—	October 24, 2000	Socorro	LINEAR	·	3.0 km	MPC · JPL
41697	2000 UJ_{46}	—	October 24, 2000	Socorro	LINEAR	NYS	3.0 km	MPC · JPL
41698	2000 UO_{46}	—	October 24, 2000	Socorro	LINEAR	·	3.6 km	MPC · JPL
41699	2000 UT_{46}	—	October 24, 2000	Socorro	LINEAR	·	2.2 km	MPC · JPL
41700	2000 UV_{46}	—	October 24, 2000	Socorro	LINEAR	·	3.7 km	MPC · JPL

== 41701–41800 ==
back to top

Designation			Discovery			Properties		Ref
Permanent	Provisional	Named after	Date	Site	Discoverer(s)	Category	Diam.	Ref
41701	2000 UY_{46}	—	October 24, 2000	Socorro	LINEAR	·	1.9 km	MPC · JPL
41702	2000 UN_{49}	—	October 24, 2000	Socorro	LINEAR	THM	5.9 km	MPC · JPL
41703	2000 UM_{50}	—	October 24, 2000	Socorro	LINEAR	V	2.7 km	MPC · JPL
41704	2000 UX_{51}	—	October 24, 2000	Socorro	LINEAR	·	3.4 km	MPC · JPL
41705	2000 UZ_{52}	—	October 24, 2000	Socorro	LINEAR	·	3.5 km	MPC · JPL
41706	2000 UU_{53}	—	October 24, 2000	Socorro	LINEAR	·	2.8 km	MPC · JPL
41707	2000 UU_{55}	—	October 24, 2000	Socorro	LINEAR	ERI	5.9 km	MPC · JPL
41708	2000 UG_{56}	—	October 24, 2000	Socorro	LINEAR	·	4.5 km	MPC · JPL
41709	2000 UH_{56}	—	October 24, 2000	Socorro	LINEAR	(194)	7.5 km	MPC · JPL
41710	2000 UZ_{59}	—	October 25, 2000	Socorro	LINEAR	·	2.5 km	MPC · JPL
41711	2000 US_{63}	—	October 25, 2000	Socorro	LINEAR	·	5.2 km	MPC · JPL
41712	2000 UZ_{68}	—	October 25, 2000	Socorro	LINEAR	(2076)	3.1 km	MPC · JPL
41713	2000 UG_{72}	—	October 25, 2000	Socorro	LINEAR	·	2.0 km	MPC · JPL
41714	2000 UO_{72}	—	October 25, 2000	Socorro	LINEAR	·	2.0 km	MPC · JPL
41715	2000 UL_{73}	—	October 26, 2000	Socorro	LINEAR	·	2.4 km	MPC · JPL
41716	2000 UP_{76}	—	October 29, 2000	Desert Beaver	W. K. Y. Yeung	·	2.6 km	MPC · JPL
41717	2000 UX_{78}	—	October 24, 2000	Socorro	LINEAR	(5)	2.7 km	MPC · JPL
41718	2000 UK_{79}	—	October 24, 2000	Socorro	LINEAR	·	2.0 km	MPC · JPL
41719	2000 UL_{79}	—	October 24, 2000	Socorro	LINEAR	·	2.1 km	MPC · JPL
41720	2000 UN_{79}	—	October 24, 2000	Socorro	LINEAR	V	2.0 km	MPC · JPL
41721	2000 UU_{79}	—	October 24, 2000	Socorro	LINEAR	·	2.3 km	MPC · JPL
41722	2000 UD_{80}	—	October 24, 2000	Socorro	LINEAR	·	5.2 km	MPC · JPL
41723	2000 UP_{80}	—	October 24, 2000	Socorro	LINEAR	·	2.8 km	MPC · JPL
41724	2000 UV_{84}	—	October 31, 2000	Socorro	LINEAR	·	2.0 km	MPC · JPL
41725	2000 UK_{86}	—	October 31, 2000	Socorro	LINEAR	·	2.5 km	MPC · JPL
41726	2000 UP_{91}	—	October 25, 2000	Socorro	LINEAR	·	2.2 km	MPC · JPL
41727	2000 UR_{91}	—	October 25, 2000	Socorro	LINEAR	·	2.0 km	MPC · JPL
41728	2000 UF_{92}	—	October 25, 2000	Socorro	LINEAR	·	3.1 km	MPC · JPL
41729	2000 UF_{95}	—	October 25, 2000	Socorro	LINEAR	V	1.4 km	MPC · JPL
41730	2000 UF_{96}	—	October 25, 2000	Socorro	LINEAR	·	2.8 km	MPC · JPL
41731	2000 UA_{97}	—	October 25, 2000	Socorro	LINEAR	·	2.0 km	MPC · JPL
41732	2000 UU_{98}	—	October 25, 2000	Socorro	LINEAR	·	3.1 km	MPC · JPL
41733	2000 UY_{98}	—	October 25, 2000	Socorro	LINEAR	·	2.4 km	MPC · JPL
41734	2000 UL_{100}	—	October 25, 2000	Socorro	LINEAR	·	2.7 km	MPC · JPL
41735	2000 UY_{100}	—	October 25, 2000	Socorro	LINEAR	·	3.1 km	MPC · JPL
41736	2000 UN_{102}	—	October 25, 2000	Socorro	LINEAR	·	3.0 km	MPC · JPL
41737	2000 UX_{103}	—	October 25, 2000	Socorro	LINEAR	V	2.3 km	MPC · JPL
41738	2000 UR_{104}	—	October 25, 2000	Socorro	LINEAR	·	2.5 km	MPC · JPL
41739	2000 UP_{112}	—	October 25, 2000	Kitt Peak	Spacewatch	·	5.9 km	MPC · JPL
41740 Yuenkwokyung	2000 VC	Yuenkwokyung	November 1, 2000	Desert Beaver	W. K. Y. Yeung	·	3.1 km	MPC · JPL
41741	2000 VG	—	November 1, 2000	Desert Beaver	W. K. Y. Yeung	·	1.9 km	MPC · JPL
41742 Wongkakui	2000 VH_{3}	Wongkakui	November 1, 2000	Desert Beaver	W. K. Y. Yeung	·	4.3 km	MPC · JPL
41743	2000 VJ_{14}	—	November 1, 2000	Socorro	LINEAR	·	2.4 km	MPC · JPL
41744	2000 VA_{15}	—	November 1, 2000	Socorro	LINEAR	·	2.2 km	MPC · JPL
41745	2000 VQ_{15}	—	November 1, 2000	Socorro	LINEAR	·	2.5 km	MPC · JPL
41746	2000 VD_{16}	—	November 1, 2000	Socorro	LINEAR	CLA	5.0 km	MPC · JPL
41747	2000 VY_{24}	—	November 1, 2000	Socorro	LINEAR	·	1.7 km	MPC · JPL
41748	2000 VC_{27}	—	November 1, 2000	Socorro	LINEAR	·	2.5 km	MPC · JPL
41749	2000 VD_{27}	—	November 1, 2000	Socorro	LINEAR	·	2.3 km	MPC · JPL
41750	2000 VK_{28}	—	November 1, 2000	Socorro	LINEAR	·	2.1 km	MPC · JPL
41751	2000 VT_{29}	—	November 1, 2000	Socorro	LINEAR	·	4.5 km	MPC · JPL
41752	2000 VF_{30}	—	November 1, 2000	Socorro	LINEAR	·	7.3 km	MPC · JPL
41753	2000 VH_{30}	—	November 1, 2000	Socorro	LINEAR	·	2.8 km	MPC · JPL
41754	2000 VS_{31}	—	November 1, 2000	Socorro	LINEAR	·	7.1 km	MPC · JPL
41755	2000 VY_{31}	—	November 1, 2000	Socorro	LINEAR	·	2.5 km	MPC · JPL
41756	2000 VE_{33}	—	November 1, 2000	Socorro	LINEAR	·	3.4 km	MPC · JPL
41757	2000 VM_{33}	—	November 1, 2000	Socorro	LINEAR	·	3.1 km	MPC · JPL
41758	2000 VP_{33}	—	November 1, 2000	Socorro	LINEAR	·	2.6 km	MPC · JPL
41759	2000 VZ_{33}	—	November 1, 2000	Socorro	LINEAR	·	2.5 km	MPC · JPL
41760	2000 VF_{34}	—	November 1, 2000	Socorro	LINEAR	·	3.4 km	MPC · JPL
41761	2000 VP_{34}	—	November 1, 2000	Socorro	LINEAR	·	2.2 km	MPC · JPL
41762	2000 VZ_{34}	—	November 1, 2000	Socorro	LINEAR	·	2.7 km	MPC · JPL
41763	2000 VA_{35}	—	November 1, 2000	Socorro	LINEAR	·	2.8 km	MPC · JPL
41764	2000 VO_{35}	—	November 1, 2000	Socorro	LINEAR	NYS ·	2.5 km	MPC · JPL
41765	2000 VV_{35}	—	November 1, 2000	Socorro	LINEAR	·	2.1 km	MPC · JPL
41766	2000 VB_{36}	—	November 1, 2000	Socorro	LINEAR	·	6.1 km	MPC · JPL
41767	2000 VQ_{36}	—	November 1, 2000	Socorro	LINEAR	EUN	4.7 km	MPC · JPL
41768	2000 VB_{37}	—	November 1, 2000	Socorro	LINEAR	·	3.6 km	MPC · JPL
41769	2000 VH_{37}	—	November 1, 2000	Socorro	LINEAR	EUN	3.4 km	MPC · JPL
41770	2000 VV_{37}	—	November 1, 2000	Socorro	LINEAR	·	4.0 km	MPC · JPL
41771	2000 VB_{38}	—	November 1, 2000	Socorro	LINEAR	·	3.2 km	MPC · JPL
41772	2000 VE_{43}	—	November 1, 2000	Socorro	LINEAR	NYS	2.4 km	MPC · JPL
41773	2000 VH_{43}	—	November 1, 2000	Socorro	LINEAR	·	3.1 km	MPC · JPL
41774	2000 VR_{44}	—	November 2, 2000	Socorro	LINEAR	·	3.1 km	MPC · JPL
41775	2000 VS_{44}	—	November 2, 2000	Socorro	LINEAR	NYS ·	3.1 km	MPC · JPL
41776	2000 VQ_{46}	—	November 3, 2000	Socorro	LINEAR	·	1.9 km	MPC · JPL
41777	2000 VW_{46}	—	November 3, 2000	Socorro	LINEAR	·	3.2 km	MPC · JPL
41778	2000 VB_{50}	—	November 2, 2000	Socorro	LINEAR	·	2.2 km	MPC · JPL
41779	2000 VK_{50}	—	November 2, 2000	Socorro	LINEAR	·	1.9 km	MPC · JPL
41780	2000 VK_{53}	—	November 3, 2000	Socorro	LINEAR	V	1.8 km	MPC · JPL
41781	2000 VL_{55}	—	November 3, 2000	Socorro	LINEAR	·	2.7 km	MPC · JPL
41782	2000 VM_{55}	—	November 3, 2000	Socorro	LINEAR	GEF	3.2 km	MPC · JPL
41783	2000 VS_{55}	—	November 3, 2000	Socorro	LINEAR	(2076)	3.1 km	MPC · JPL
41784	2000 VD_{56}	—	November 3, 2000	Socorro	LINEAR	·	2.9 km	MPC · JPL
41785	2000 VF_{56}	—	November 3, 2000	Socorro	LINEAR	·	3.8 km	MPC · JPL
41786	2000 VL_{57}	—	November 3, 2000	Socorro	LINEAR	ADE	6.5 km	MPC · JPL
41787	2000 VO_{57}	—	November 3, 2000	Socorro	LINEAR	·	5.6 km	MPC · JPL
41788	2000 VS_{60}	—	November 1, 2000	Socorro	LINEAR	·	3.2 km	MPC · JPL
41789	2000 VW_{60}	—	November 1, 2000	Socorro	LINEAR	V	3.5 km	MPC · JPL
41790	2000 WY_{1}	—	November 17, 2000	Kitt Peak	Spacewatch	·	3.8 km	MPC · JPL
41791	2000 WJ_{3}	—	November 19, 2000	Fountain Hills	C. W. Juels	·	3.8 km	MPC · JPL
41792	2000 WH_{6}	—	November 19, 2000	Socorro	LINEAR	PHO · slow	2.9 km	MPC · JPL
41793	2000 WW_{6}	—	November 19, 2000	Socorro	LINEAR	·	3.3 km	MPC · JPL
41794	2000 WK_{11}	—	November 24, 2000	Elmira	Cecce, A. J.	·	6.2 km	MPC · JPL
41795 Wiens	2000 WN_{12}	Wiens	November 22, 2000	Haleakala	NEAT	·	8.4 km	MPC · JPL
41796	2000 WL_{17}	—	November 21, 2000	Socorro	LINEAR	·	2.6 km	MPC · JPL
41797	2000 WN_{18}	—	November 21, 2000	Socorro	LINEAR	KOR	3.8 km	MPC · JPL
41798	2000 WV_{18}	—	November 21, 2000	Socorro	LINEAR	V	1.9 km	MPC · JPL
41799	2000 WL_{19}	—	November 25, 2000	Fountain Hills	C. W. Juels	·	10 km	MPC · JPL
41800 Robwilliams	2000 WM_{19}	Robwilliams	November 25, 2000	Fountain Hills	C. W. Juels	·	8.1 km	MPC · JPL

== 41801–41900 ==
back to top

Designation			Discovery			Properties		Ref
Permanent	Provisional	Named after	Date	Site	Discoverer(s)	Category	Diam.	Ref
41801	2000 WG_{22}	—	November 20, 2000	Socorro	LINEAR	·	1.4 km	MPC · JPL
41802	2000 WD_{24}	—	November 20, 2000	Socorro	LINEAR	·	2.3 km	MPC · JPL
41803	2000 WR_{24}	—	November 20, 2000	Socorro	LINEAR	V	1.5 km	MPC · JPL
41804	2000 WA_{30}	—	November 23, 2000	Haleakala	NEAT	·	5.2 km	MPC · JPL
41805	2000 WC_{30}	—	November 20, 2000	Socorro	LINEAR	·	2.1 km	MPC · JPL
41806	2000 WF_{32}	—	November 20, 2000	Socorro	LINEAR	GEF · slow	2.9 km	MPC · JPL
41807	2000 WS_{33}	—	November 20, 2000	Socorro	LINEAR	V	1.4 km	MPC · JPL
41808	2000 WG_{34}	—	November 20, 2000	Socorro	LINEAR	·	2.3 km	MPC · JPL
41809	2000 WX_{34}	—	November 20, 2000	Socorro	LINEAR	·	2.8 km	MPC · JPL
41810	2000 WG_{35}	—	November 20, 2000	Socorro	LINEAR	·	3.2 km	MPC · JPL
41811	2000 WK_{35}	—	November 20, 2000	Socorro	LINEAR	·	2.3 km	MPC · JPL
41812	2000 WP_{35}	—	November 20, 2000	Socorro	LINEAR	V	1.6 km	MPC · JPL
41813	2000 WY_{35}	—	November 20, 2000	Socorro	LINEAR	·	6.1 km	MPC · JPL
41814	2000 WP_{36}	—	November 20, 2000	Socorro	LINEAR	·	2.7 km	MPC · JPL
41815	2000 WU_{36}	—	November 20, 2000	Socorro	LINEAR	V	2.2 km	MPC · JPL
41816	2000 WN_{38}	—	November 20, 2000	Socorro	LINEAR	·	3.0 km	MPC · JPL
41817	2000 WX_{40}	—	November 20, 2000	Socorro	LINEAR	·	3.5 km	MPC · JPL
41818	2000 WC_{41}	—	November 20, 2000	Socorro	LINEAR	·	3.7 km	MPC · JPL
41819	2000 WK_{44}	—	November 21, 2000	Socorro	LINEAR	DOR	7.3 km	MPC · JPL
41820	2000 WT_{45}	—	November 21, 2000	Socorro	LINEAR	·	1.8 km	MPC · JPL
41821	2000 WU_{45}	—	November 21, 2000	Socorro	LINEAR	·	3.0 km	MPC · JPL
41822	2000 WW_{47}	—	November 21, 2000	Socorro	LINEAR	V	2.2 km	MPC · JPL
41823	2000 WZ_{47}	—	November 21, 2000	Socorro	LINEAR	·	3.8 km	MPC · JPL
41824	2000 WQ_{48}	—	November 21, 2000	Socorro	LINEAR	·	2.8 km	MPC · JPL
41825	2000 WZ_{48}	—	November 21, 2000	Socorro	LINEAR	·	5.4 km	MPC · JPL
41826	2000 WH_{49}	—	November 21, 2000	Socorro	LINEAR	·	3.9 km	MPC · JPL
41827	2000 WN_{49}	—	November 21, 2000	Socorro	LINEAR	EUN	4.1 km	MPC · JPL
41828	2000 WM_{50}	—	November 26, 2000	Socorro	LINEAR	·	5.0 km	MPC · JPL
41829	2000 WU_{53}	—	November 27, 2000	Kitt Peak	Spacewatch	NYS	2.4 km	MPC · JPL
41830	2000 WT_{56}	—	November 21, 2000	Socorro	LINEAR	V	3.6 km	MPC · JPL
41831	2000 WN_{57}	—	November 21, 2000	Socorro	LINEAR	NYS	3.6 km	MPC · JPL
41832	2000 WB_{58}	—	November 21, 2000	Socorro	LINEAR	·	5.8 km	MPC · JPL
41833	2000 WE_{58}	—	November 21, 2000	Socorro	LINEAR	·	4.2 km	MPC · JPL
41834	2000 WL_{58}	—	November 21, 2000	Socorro	LINEAR	·	7.1 km	MPC · JPL
41835	2000 WO_{58}	—	November 21, 2000	Socorro	LINEAR	MAS	2.4 km	MPC · JPL
41836	2000 WP_{58}	—	November 21, 2000	Socorro	LINEAR	PHO	3.1 km	MPC · JPL
41837	2000 WS_{58}	—	November 21, 2000	Socorro	LINEAR	·	3.0 km	MPC · JPL
41838	2000 WK_{59}	—	November 21, 2000	Socorro	LINEAR	·	5.7 km	MPC · JPL
41839	2000 WO_{59}	—	November 21, 2000	Socorro	LINEAR	·	3.0 km	MPC · JPL
41840	2000 WS_{59}	—	November 21, 2000	Socorro	LINEAR	·	2.8 km	MPC · JPL
41841	2000 WF_{60}	—	November 21, 2000	Socorro	LINEAR	(5)	3.1 km	MPC · JPL
41842	2000 WO_{60}	—	November 21, 2000	Socorro	LINEAR	MAR	4.7 km	MPC · JPL
41843	2000 WX_{70}	—	November 19, 2000	Socorro	LINEAR	·	2.8 km	MPC · JPL
41844	2000 WO_{72}	—	November 19, 2000	Socorro	LINEAR	·	3.5 km	MPC · JPL
41845	2000 WW_{83}	—	November 20, 2000	Socorro	LINEAR	NEM	5.0 km	MPC · JPL
41846	2000 WB_{86}	—	November 20, 2000	Socorro	LINEAR	·	2.7 km	MPC · JPL
41847	2000 WK_{86}	—	November 20, 2000	Socorro	LINEAR	·	2.9 km	MPC · JPL
41848	2000 WM_{86}	—	November 20, 2000	Socorro	LINEAR	·	2.9 km	MPC · JPL
41849	2000 WS_{86}	—	November 20, 2000	Socorro	LINEAR	V	2.9 km	MPC · JPL
41850	2000 WF_{87}	—	November 20, 2000	Socorro	LINEAR	·	2.4 km	MPC · JPL
41851	2000 WK_{87}	—	November 20, 2000	Socorro	LINEAR	·	2.6 km	MPC · JPL
41852	2000 WN_{87}	—	November 20, 2000	Socorro	LINEAR	TIR	5.4 km	MPC · JPL
41853	2000 WY_{87}	—	November 20, 2000	Socorro	LINEAR	BAP	3.6 km	MPC · JPL
41854	2000 WF_{88}	—	November 20, 2000	Socorro	LINEAR	·	3.0 km	MPC · JPL
41855	2000 WV_{89}	—	November 21, 2000	Socorro	LINEAR	·	3.3 km	MPC · JPL
41856	2000 WL_{90}	—	November 21, 2000	Socorro	LINEAR	·	3.7 km	MPC · JPL
41857	2000 WU_{91}	—	November 21, 2000	Socorro	LINEAR	·	1.8 km	MPC · JPL
41858	2000 WU_{93}	—	November 21, 2000	Socorro	LINEAR	MIS	7.7 km	MPC · JPL
41859	2000 WD_{95}	—	November 21, 2000	Socorro	LINEAR	·	2.7 km	MPC · JPL
41860	2000 WW_{95}	—	November 21, 2000	Socorro	LINEAR	·	2.2 km	MPC · JPL
41861	2000 WH_{96}	—	November 21, 2000	Socorro	LINEAR	·	2.6 km	MPC · JPL
41862	2000 WK_{96}	—	November 21, 2000	Socorro	LINEAR	·	5.6 km	MPC · JPL
41863	2000 WU_{96}	—	November 21, 2000	Socorro	LINEAR	·	3.2 km	MPC · JPL
41864	2000 WC_{97}	—	November 21, 2000	Socorro	LINEAR	NYS	5.3 km	MPC · JPL
41865	2000 WW_{97}	—	November 21, 2000	Socorro	LINEAR	WIT ·	4.4 km	MPC · JPL
41866	2000 WX_{97}	—	November 21, 2000	Socorro	LINEAR	V	2.5 km	MPC · JPL
41867	2000 WB_{99}	—	November 21, 2000	Socorro	LINEAR	(12739)	3.7 km	MPC · JPL
41868	2000 WH_{99}	—	November 21, 2000	Socorro	LINEAR	·	3.6 km	MPC · JPL
41869	2000 WK_{99}	—	November 21, 2000	Socorro	LINEAR	KOR	3.8 km	MPC · JPL
41870	2000 WV_{99}	—	November 21, 2000	Socorro	LINEAR	·	1.8 km	MPC · JPL
41871	2000 WD_{100}	—	November 21, 2000	Socorro	LINEAR	·	1.9 km	MPC · JPL
41872	2000 WJ_{100}	—	November 21, 2000	Socorro	LINEAR	(5)	2.8 km	MPC · JPL
41873	2000 WR_{100}	—	November 21, 2000	Socorro	LINEAR	·	2.2 km	MPC · JPL
41874	2000 WY_{100}	—	November 21, 2000	Socorro	LINEAR	·	8.0 km	MPC · JPL
41875	2000 WZ_{100}	—	November 21, 2000	Socorro	LINEAR	·	3.8 km	MPC · JPL
41876	2000 WB_{101}	—	November 21, 2000	Socorro	LINEAR	·	3.0 km	MPC · JPL
41877	2000 WE_{103}	—	November 26, 2000	Socorro	LINEAR	·	5.9 km	MPC · JPL
41878	2000 WH_{104}	—	November 27, 2000	Socorro	LINEAR	·	5.5 km	MPC · JPL
41879	2000 WO_{104}	—	November 28, 2000	Socorro	LINEAR	·	2.6 km	MPC · JPL
41880	2000 WR_{107}	—	November 20, 2000	Socorro	LINEAR	·	3.5 km	MPC · JPL
41881	2000 WH_{109}	—	November 20, 2000	Socorro	LINEAR	·	2.8 km	MPC · JPL
41882	2000 WD_{111}	—	November 20, 2000	Socorro	LINEAR	·	2.5 km	MPC · JPL
41883	2000 WF_{111}	—	November 20, 2000	Socorro	LINEAR	·	2.6 km	MPC · JPL
41884	2000 WO_{113}	—	November 20, 2000	Socorro	LINEAR	·	3.4 km	MPC · JPL
41885	2000 WA_{115}	—	November 20, 2000	Socorro	LINEAR	PAD	5.2 km	MPC · JPL
41886	2000 WM_{115}	—	November 20, 2000	Socorro	LINEAR	·	3.1 km	MPC · JPL
41887	2000 WW_{115}	—	November 20, 2000	Socorro	LINEAR	·	2.1 km	MPC · JPL
41888	2000 WC_{118}	—	November 20, 2000	Socorro	LINEAR	·	3.2 km	MPC · JPL
41889	2000 WF_{118}	—	November 20, 2000	Socorro	LINEAR	·	2.5 km	MPC · JPL
41890	2000 WM_{118}	—	November 20, 2000	Socorro	LINEAR	·	4.5 km	MPC · JPL
41891	2000 WC_{119}	—	November 20, 2000	Socorro	LINEAR	·	6.2 km	MPC · JPL
41892	2000 WS_{119}	—	November 20, 2000	Socorro	LINEAR	(5)	5.7 km	MPC · JPL
41893	2000 WU_{119}	—	November 20, 2000	Socorro	LINEAR	·	2.4 km	MPC · JPL
41894	2000 WH_{121}	—	November 21, 2000	Socorro	LINEAR	V	2.2 km	MPC · JPL
41895	2000 WJ_{121}	—	November 21, 2000	Socorro	LINEAR	·	5.7 km	MPC · JPL
41896	2000 WN_{123}	—	November 29, 2000	Socorro	LINEAR	·	3.0 km	MPC · JPL
41897	2000 WP_{123}	—	November 29, 2000	Socorro	LINEAR	·	2.8 km	MPC · JPL
41898	2000 WN_{124}	—	November 19, 2000	Socorro	LINEAR	·	3.2 km	MPC · JPL
41899	2000 WY_{124}	—	November 27, 2000	Haleakala	NEAT	·	14 km	MPC · JPL
41900	2000 WV_{126}	—	November 16, 2000	Kitt Peak	Spacewatch	·	2.1 km	MPC · JPL

== 41901–42000 ==
back to top

Designation			Discovery			Properties		Ref
Permanent	Provisional	Named after	Date	Site	Discoverer(s)	Category	Diam.	Ref
41901	2000 WP_{127}	—	November 17, 2000	Kitt Peak	Spacewatch	·	3.3 km	MPC · JPL
41902	2000 WA_{128}	—	November 18, 2000	Desert Beaver	W. K. Y. Yeung	THM	8.3 km	MPC · JPL
41903	2000 WO_{128}	—	November 18, 2000	Kitt Peak	Spacewatch	·	1.7 km	MPC · JPL
41904	2000 WJ_{130}	—	November 19, 2000	Kitt Peak	Spacewatch	HYG	6.9 km	MPC · JPL
41905	2000 WE_{133}	—	November 19, 2000	Socorro	LINEAR	·	2.6 km	MPC · JPL
41906	2000 WO_{135}	—	November 19, 2000	Socorro	LINEAR	URS	7.6 km	MPC · JPL
41907 Jonathanford	2000 WF_{137}	Jonathanford	November 20, 2000	Anderson Mesa	LONEOS	MAR	3.1 km	MPC · JPL
41908	2000 WR_{137}	—	November 20, 2000	Socorro	LINEAR	·	2.3 km	MPC · JPL
41909	2000 WO_{141}	—	November 19, 2000	Socorro	LINEAR	DOR	9.3 km	MPC · JPL
41910	2000 WS_{141}	—	November 19, 2000	Socorro	LINEAR	·	2.8 km	MPC · JPL
41911	2000 WH_{143}	—	November 20, 2000	Anderson Mesa	LONEOS	PHO	5.4 km	MPC · JPL
41912	2000 WR_{144}	—	November 21, 2000	Socorro	LINEAR	·	2.2 km	MPC · JPL
41913	2000 WF_{149}	—	November 29, 2000	Haleakala	NEAT	EUN	3.2 km	MPC · JPL
41914	2000 WY_{151}	—	November 29, 2000	Haleakala	NEAT	JUN	4.3 km	MPC · JPL
41915	2000 WJ_{152}	—	November 27, 2000	Socorro	LINEAR	·	3.4 km	MPC · JPL
41916	2000 WT_{152}	—	November 29, 2000	Socorro	LINEAR	·	3.0 km	MPC · JPL
41917	2000 WC_{153}	—	November 29, 2000	Socorro	LINEAR	slow?	2.1 km	MPC · JPL
41918	2000 WA_{156}	—	November 30, 2000	Socorro	LINEAR	·	4.0 km	MPC · JPL
41919	2000 WW_{156}	—	November 30, 2000	Socorro	LINEAR	·	5.8 km	MPC · JPL
41920	2000 WA_{158}	—	November 30, 2000	Socorro	LINEAR	·	2.9 km	MPC · JPL
41921	2000 WL_{158}	—	November 30, 2000	Socorro	LINEAR	·	3.6 km	MPC · JPL
41922	2000 WT_{158}	—	November 30, 2000	Haleakala	NEAT	(2076)	3.2 km	MPC · JPL
41923	2000 WN_{159}	—	November 19, 2000	Socorro	LINEAR	EUN	4.4 km	MPC · JPL
41924	2000 WF_{160}	—	November 20, 2000	Anderson Mesa	LONEOS	·	3.2 km	MPC · JPL
41925	2000 WJ_{161}	—	November 20, 2000	Anderson Mesa	LONEOS	MAR	3.6 km	MPC · JPL
41926	2000 WQ_{161}	—	November 20, 2000	Anderson Mesa	LONEOS	·	2.5 km	MPC · JPL
41927 Bonal	2000 WM_{166}	Bonal	November 24, 2000	Anderson Mesa	LONEOS	THM	4.9 km	MPC · JPL
41928	2000 WQ_{172}	—	November 25, 2000	Socorro	LINEAR	·	2.7 km	MPC · JPL
41929	2000 WC_{175}	—	November 26, 2000	Socorro	LINEAR	·	2.8 km	MPC · JPL
41930	2000 WO_{175}	—	November 26, 2000	Socorro	LINEAR	·	6.0 km	MPC · JPL
41931	2000 WO_{177}	—	November 27, 2000	Socorro	LINEAR	·	2.3 km	MPC · JPL
41932	2000 WF_{178}	—	November 28, 2000	Kitt Peak	Spacewatch	·	6.6 km	MPC · JPL
41933	2000 WH_{179}	—	November 26, 2000	Socorro	LINEAR	·	3.9 km	MPC · JPL
41934	2000 WO_{179}	—	November 26, 2000	Socorro	LINEAR	·	6.1 km	MPC · JPL
41935	2000 WQ_{179}	—	November 26, 2000	Socorro	LINEAR	MAR	4.3 km	MPC · JPL
41936	2000 WX_{179}	—	November 27, 2000	Socorro	LINEAR	·	1.8 km	MPC · JPL
41937	2000 WJ_{185}	—	November 29, 2000	Socorro	LINEAR	·	4.4 km	MPC · JPL
41938	2000 WO_{185}	—	November 29, 2000	Socorro	LINEAR	·	2.6 km	MPC · JPL
41939	2000 WQ_{186}	—	November 27, 2000	Socorro	LINEAR	·	3.5 km	MPC · JPL
41940	2000 WR_{190}	—	November 18, 2000	Anderson Mesa	LONEOS	AGN	2.6 km	MPC · JPL
41941	2000 XF	—	December 2, 2000	Oaxaca	Roe, J. M.	·	3.4 km	MPC · JPL
41942	2000 XW_{1}	—	December 3, 2000	Kitt Peak	Spacewatch	·	3.9 km	MPC · JPL
41943 Fredrick	2000 XH_{2}	Fredrick	December 3, 2000	Olathe	Robinson, L.	EUN	4.1 km	MPC · JPL
41944	2000 XR_{2}	—	December 1, 2000	Socorro	LINEAR	·	2.7 km	MPC · JPL
41945	2000 XY_{5}	—	December 1, 2000	Socorro	LINEAR	·	3.8 km	MPC · JPL
41946	2000 XF_{6}	—	December 1, 2000	Socorro	LINEAR	·	5.6 km	MPC · JPL
41947	2000 XW_{7}	—	December 1, 2000	Socorro	LINEAR	·	4.5 km	MPC · JPL
41948	2000 XX_{7}	—	December 1, 2000	Socorro	LINEAR	·	3.5 km	MPC · JPL
41949	2000 XB_{8}	—	December 1, 2000	Socorro	LINEAR	·	2.7 km	MPC · JPL
41950	2000 XA_{9}	—	December 1, 2000	Socorro	LINEAR	EUN	3.1 km	MPC · JPL
41951	2000 XH_{10}	—	December 1, 2000	Socorro	LINEAR	HNS	3.9 km	MPC · JPL
41952	2000 XA_{11}	—	December 1, 2000	Haleakala	NEAT	TIR	10 km	MPC · JPL
41953	2000 XK_{16}	—	December 1, 2000	Socorro	LINEAR	EOS	4.9 km	MPC · JPL
41954	2000 XX_{20}	—	December 4, 2000	Socorro	LINEAR	V	1.3 km	MPC · JPL
41955	2000 XD_{22}	—	December 4, 2000	Socorro	LINEAR	·	3.0 km	MPC · JPL
41956	2000 XB_{27}	—	December 4, 2000	Socorro	LINEAR	EOS	5.0 km	MPC · JPL
41957	2000 XD_{27}	—	December 4, 2000	Socorro	LINEAR	·	2.4 km	MPC · JPL
41958	2000 XK_{29}	—	December 4, 2000	Socorro	LINEAR	·	3.0 km	MPC · JPL
41959	2000 XV_{29}	—	December 4, 2000	Socorro	LINEAR	·	3.7 km	MPC · JPL
41960	2000 XR_{30}	—	December 4, 2000	Socorro	LINEAR	·	6.9 km	MPC · JPL
41961	2000 XS_{32}	—	December 4, 2000	Socorro	LINEAR	·	2.5 km	MPC · JPL
41962	2000 XG_{35}	—	December 4, 2000	Socorro	LINEAR	MAR	3.4 km	MPC · JPL
41963	2000 XU_{35}	—	December 5, 2000	Socorro	LINEAR	·	3.8 km	MPC · JPL
41964	2000 XW_{36}	—	December 5, 2000	Socorro	LINEAR	·	6.3 km	MPC · JPL
41965	2000 XP_{37}	—	December 5, 2000	Socorro	LINEAR	·	4.4 km	MPC · JPL
41966	2000 XU_{37}	—	December 5, 2000	Socorro	LINEAR	MAR	3.7 km	MPC · JPL
41967	2000 XE_{39}	—	December 4, 2000	Socorro	LINEAR	EUN	2.5 km	MPC · JPL
41968	2000 XE_{53}	—	December 6, 2000	Socorro	LINEAR	·	3.8 km	MPC · JPL
41969	2000 YX	—	December 17, 2000	Kitt Peak	Spacewatch	MAS	2.8 km	MPC · JPL
41970	2000 YZ_{3}	—	December 18, 2000	Kitt Peak	Spacewatch	·	3.0 km	MPC · JPL
41971	2000 YM_{6}	—	December 20, 2000	Socorro	LINEAR	·	4.4 km	MPC · JPL
41972	2000 YO_{8}	—	December 17, 2000	Kitt Peak	Spacewatch	·	4.0 km	MPC · JPL
41973	2000 YT_{11}	—	December 19, 2000	Haleakala	NEAT	·	7.5 km	MPC · JPL
41974	2000 YW_{11}	—	December 19, 2000	Haleakala	NEAT	·	4.3 km	MPC · JPL
41975	2000 YU_{12}	—	December 23, 2000	Desert Beaver	W. K. Y. Yeung	·	4.3 km	MPC · JPL
41976	2000 YA_{15}	—	December 21, 2000	Uccle	T. Pauwels	·	2.3 km	MPC · JPL
41977	2000 YU_{15}	—	December 22, 2000	Anderson Mesa	LONEOS	·	5.6 km	MPC · JPL
41978	2000 YX_{15}	—	December 22, 2000	Anderson Mesa	LONEOS	·	4.4 km	MPC · JPL
41979 Lelumacri	2000 YK_{16}	Lelumacri	December 22, 2000	Gnosca	S. Sposetti	·	5.2 km	MPC · JPL
41980	2000 YG_{18}	—	December 20, 2000	Socorro	LINEAR	V	1.9 km	MPC · JPL
41981 Yaobeina	2000 YD_{21}	Yaobeina	December 28, 2000	Desert Beaver	W. K. Y. Yeung	EUN	4.4 km	MPC · JPL
41982	2000 YE_{21}	—	December 29, 2000	Desert Beaver	W. K. Y. Yeung	·	2.3 km	MPC · JPL
41983	2000 YL_{26}	—	December 28, 2000	Socorro	LINEAR	·	2.9 km	MPC · JPL
41984	2000 YQ_{26}	—	December 28, 2000	Socorro	LINEAR	·	8.5 km	MPC · JPL
41985	2000 YY_{28}	—	December 29, 2000	Anderson Mesa	LONEOS	·	2.4 km	MPC · JPL
41986 Fort Bend	2000 YR_{29}	Fort Bend	December 29, 2000	Needville	Needville	·	2.8 km	MPC · JPL
41987	2000 YW_{29}	—	December 27, 2000	Oizumi	T. Kobayashi	MAR	4.7 km	MPC · JPL
41988 Emilyjoseph	2000 YX_{30}	Emilyjoseph	December 27, 2000	Kitt Peak	Spacewatch	KOR	3.0 km	MPC · JPL
41989	2000 YX_{33}	—	December 28, 2000	Socorro	LINEAR	·	3.3 km	MPC · JPL
41990	2000 YG_{34}	—	December 28, 2000	Socorro	LINEAR	·	3.5 km	MPC · JPL
41991	2000 YJ_{34}	—	December 28, 2000	Socorro	LINEAR	AEG	12 km	MPC · JPL
41992	2000 YR_{35}	—	December 30, 2000	Socorro	LINEAR	·	2.4 km	MPC · JPL
41993	2000 YD_{38}	—	December 30, 2000	Socorro	LINEAR	CYB · slow	7.7 km	MPC · JPL
41994	2000 YX_{38}	—	December 30, 2000	Socorro	LINEAR	·	4.4 km	MPC · JPL
41995	2000 YF_{41}	—	December 30, 2000	Socorro	LINEAR	(5)	3.6 km	MPC · JPL
41996	2000 YE_{43}	—	December 30, 2000	Socorro	LINEAR	·	2.0 km	MPC · JPL
41997	2000 YG_{45}	—	December 30, 2000	Socorro	LINEAR	KOR	3.3 km	MPC · JPL
41998	2000 YO_{45}	—	December 30, 2000	Socorro	LINEAR	EMA	8.4 km	MPC · JPL
41999	2000 YX_{45}	—	December 30, 2000	Socorro	LINEAR	·	3.1 km	MPC · JPL
42000	2000 YT_{46}	—	December 30, 2000	Socorro	LINEAR	·	4.6 km	MPC · JPL

back to top

== See also ==
- Meanings of minor-planet names: 41001–42000
