= List of minor planets: 45001–46000 =

The following is a partial list of minor planets, running from minor-planet number 45001 through 46000, inclusive. The primary data for this and other partial lists is based on JPL's "Small-Body Orbital Elements" and data available from the Minor Planet Center. Critical list information is also provided by the MPC, unless otherwise specified from Lowell Observatory. A detailed description of the table's columns and additional sources are given on the main page including a complete list of every page in this series, and a statistical break-up on the dynamical classification of minor planets.

Also see the summary list of all named bodies in numerical and alphabetical order, and the corresponding naming citations for the number range of this particular list. New namings may only be added to this list after official publication, as the preannouncement of names is condemned by the Working Group for Small Bodies Nomenclature of the International Astronomical Union.

Near-Earth obj.	MBA (inner)	MBA (outer)	Centaur
Mars-crosser	MBA (middle)	Jupiter trojan	Trans-Neptunian obj.
Unclassified

== 45001–45100 ==
Designation			Discovery			Properties		Ref
Permanent	Provisional	Named after	Date	Site	Discoverer(s)	Category	Diam.	Ref
45001	1999 VZ_{186}	—	November 15, 1999	Socorro	LINEAR	·	3.8 km	MPC · JPL
45002	1999 VS_{193}	—	November 3, 1999	Anderson Mesa	LONEOS	·	2.3 km	MPC · JPL
45003	1999 VL_{194}	—	November 1, 1999	Catalina	CSS	·	4.0 km	MPC · JPL
45004	1999 VD_{197}	—	November 2, 1999	Catalina	CSS	·	1.3 km	MPC · JPL
45005	1999 VR_{198}	—	November 3, 1999	Catalina	CSS	fast	2.1 km	MPC · JPL
45006	1999 VV_{198}	—	November 3, 1999	Catalina	CSS	V	1.1 km	MPC · JPL
45007	1999 VD_{201}	—	November 6, 1999	Catalina	CSS	·	5.3 km	MPC · JPL
45008	1999 VN_{201}	—	November 3, 1999	Socorro	LINEAR	·	4.2 km	MPC · JPL
45009	1999 VR_{204}	—	November 9, 1999	Catalina	CSS	EUN	5.1 km	MPC · JPL
45010	1999 VS_{209}	—	November 11, 1999	Catalina	CSS	·	5.7 km	MPC · JPL
45011	1999 VC_{217}	—	November 4, 1999	Socorro	LINEAR	(5)	3.0 km	MPC · JPL
45012	1999 VY_{222}	—	November 7, 1999	Socorro	LINEAR	·	3.5 km	MPC · JPL
45013	1999 WK	—	November 16, 1999	Oizumi	T. Kobayashi	·	5.2 km	MPC · JPL
45014	1999 WP	—	November 18, 1999	Oizumi	T. Kobayashi	·	3.1 km	MPC · JPL
45015	1999 WQ	—	November 16, 1999	Ondřejov	P. Kušnirák	·	3.3 km	MPC · JPL
45016	1999 WV_{2}	—	November 30, 1999	Kleť	Kleť	GEF	3.7 km	MPC · JPL
45017	1999 WK_{3}	—	November 28, 1999	Oizumi	T. Kobayashi	PHO	3.7 km	MPC · JPL
45018	1999 WS_{3}	—	November 28, 1999	Oizumi	T. Kobayashi	·	2.5 km	MPC · JPL
45019	1999 WU_{4}	—	November 28, 1999	Oizumi	T. Kobayashi	V	2.6 km	MPC · JPL
45020	1999 WC_{5}	—	November 28, 1999	Oizumi	T. Kobayashi	EOS	9.6 km	MPC · JPL
45021	1999 WE_{6}	—	November 28, 1999	Višnjan Observatory	K. Korlević	·	4.3 km	MPC · JPL
45022	1999 WF_{6}	—	November 28, 1999	Višnjan Observatory	K. Korlević	·	3.1 km	MPC · JPL
45023	1999 WM_{6}	—	November 28, 1999	Višnjan Observatory	K. Korlević	(5)	3.1 km	MPC · JPL
45024	1999 WN_{7}	—	November 28, 1999	Višnjan Observatory	K. Korlević	·	4.0 km	MPC · JPL
45025	1999 WY_{7}	—	November 29, 1999	Višnjan Observatory	K. Korlević	·	7.6 km	MPC · JPL
45026	1999 WE_{8}	—	November 28, 1999	Kvistaberg	Uppsala-DLR Asteroid Survey	·	1.7 km	MPC · JPL
45027 Cosquer	1999 WA_{9}	Cosquer	November 28, 1999	Gnosca	S. Sposetti	·	4.8 km	MPC · JPL
45028	1999 WD_{9}	—	November 28, 1999	Črni Vrh	Matičič, S.	·	5.5 km	MPC · JPL
45029	1999 WN_{9}	—	November 30, 1999	Oizumi	T. Kobayashi	·	2.9 km	MPC · JPL
45030	1999 WJ_{13}	—	November 30, 1999	Kitt Peak	Spacewatch	·	2.6 km	MPC · JPL
45031	1999 WR_{13}	—	November 29, 1999	Višnjan Observatory	K. Korlević	·	4.9 km	MPC · JPL
45032	1999 WL_{16}	—	November 29, 1999	Kitt Peak	Spacewatch	·	2.9 km	MPC · JPL
45033	1999 WL_{20}	—	November 16, 1999	Socorro	LINEAR	·	4.7 km	MPC · JPL
45034	1999 XA_{2}	—	December 3, 1999	Fountain Hills	C. W. Juels	EUN	3.6 km	MPC · JPL
45035	1999 XB_{2}	—	December 3, 1999	Fountain Hills	C. W. Juels	·	3.3 km	MPC · JPL
45036	1999 XD_{3}	—	December 4, 1999	Catalina	CSS	·	2.8 km	MPC · JPL
45037	1999 XP_{4}	—	December 4, 1999	Catalina	CSS	·	3.0 km	MPC · JPL
45038	1999 XE_{6}	—	December 4, 1999	Catalina	CSS	V	1.8 km	MPC · JPL
45039	1999 XW_{7}	—	December 4, 1999	Prescott	P. G. Comba	·	2.7 km	MPC · JPL
45040	1999 XJ_{8}	—	December 3, 1999	Oizumi	T. Kobayashi	·	4.3 km	MPC · JPL
45041	1999 XE_{10}	—	December 5, 1999	Catalina	CSS	V	2.0 km	MPC · JPL
45042	1999 XW_{10}	—	December 5, 1999	Catalina	CSS	·	4.3 km	MPC · JPL
45043	1999 XG_{11}	—	December 5, 1999	Catalina	CSS	V	1.8 km	MPC · JPL
45044	1999 XW_{12}	—	December 5, 1999	Socorro	LINEAR	·	3.5 km	MPC · JPL
45045	1999 XD_{17}	—	December 7, 1999	Socorro	LINEAR	PHO	3.2 km	MPC · JPL
45046	1999 XN_{20}	—	December 5, 1999	Socorro	LINEAR	NYS	3.1 km	MPC · JPL
45047	1999 XO_{20}	—	December 5, 1999	Socorro	LINEAR	·	4.2 km	MPC · JPL
45048	1999 XB_{21}	—	December 5, 1999	Socorro	LINEAR	·	2.5 km	MPC · JPL
45049	1999 XL_{21}	—	December 5, 1999	Socorro	LINEAR	·	1.9 km	MPC · JPL
45050	1999 XW_{21}	—	December 5, 1999	Socorro	LINEAR	EUN	5.0 km	MPC · JPL
45051	1999 XP_{22}	—	December 6, 1999	Socorro	LINEAR	·	2.7 km	MPC · JPL
45052	1999 XX_{23}	—	December 6, 1999	Socorro	LINEAR	V	1.7 km	MPC · JPL
45053	1999 XK_{26}	—	December 6, 1999	Socorro	LINEAR	NYS	3.0 km	MPC · JPL
45054	1999 XN_{26}	—	December 6, 1999	Socorro	LINEAR	·	3.0 km	MPC · JPL
45055	1999 XT_{26}	—	December 6, 1999	Socorro	LINEAR	·	2.2 km	MPC · JPL
45056	1999 XR_{27}	—	December 6, 1999	Socorro	LINEAR	·	3.1 km	MPC · JPL
45057	1999 XO_{29}	—	December 6, 1999	Socorro	LINEAR	·	3.0 km	MPC · JPL
45058	1999 XR_{29}	—	December 6, 1999	Socorro	LINEAR	·	1.9 km	MPC · JPL
45059	1999 XT_{29}	—	December 6, 1999	Socorro	LINEAR	V	1.9 km	MPC · JPL
45060	1999 XL_{30}	—	December 6, 1999	Socorro	LINEAR	·	3.5 km	MPC · JPL
45061	1999 XL_{31}	—	December 6, 1999	Socorro	LINEAR	·	4.0 km	MPC · JPL
45062	1999 XM_{31}	—	December 6, 1999	Socorro	LINEAR	·	4.8 km	MPC · JPL
45063	1999 XR_{31}	—	December 6, 1999	Socorro	LINEAR	EUN	4.5 km	MPC · JPL
45064	1999 XT_{31}	—	December 6, 1999	Socorro	LINEAR	·	6.0 km	MPC · JPL
45065	1999 XU_{31}	—	December 6, 1999	Socorro	LINEAR	·	3.9 km	MPC · JPL
45066	1999 XN_{32}	—	December 6, 1999	Socorro	LINEAR	·	7.0 km	MPC · JPL
45067	1999 XW_{32}	—	December 6, 1999	Socorro	LINEAR	·	5.3 km	MPC · JPL
45068	1999 XA_{34}	—	December 6, 1999	Socorro	LINEAR	EOS	8.1 km	MPC · JPL
45069	1999 XB_{35}	—	December 6, 1999	Socorro	LINEAR	·	9.6 km	MPC · JPL
45070	1999 XA_{36}	—	December 6, 1999	Gekko	T. Kagawa	NYS	1.7 km	MPC · JPL
45071	1999 XA_{37}	—	December 7, 1999	Oaxaca	Roe, J. M.	·	2.1 km	MPC · JPL
45072	1999 XC_{37}	—	December 7, 1999	Fountain Hills	C. W. Juels	·	3.1 km	MPC · JPL
45073 Doyanrose	1999 XN_{37}	Doyanrose	December 7, 1999	Doyan Rose	Ruthroff, J.	·	4.1 km	MPC · JPL
45074	1999 XA_{38}	—	December 6, 1999	Gnosca	S. Sposetti	·	1.6 km	MPC · JPL
45075	1999 XB_{38}	—	December 6, 1999	Gnosca	S. Sposetti	·	5.9 km	MPC · JPL
45076	1999 XQ_{38}	—	December 8, 1999	Socorro	LINEAR	·	7.3 km	MPC · JPL
45077	1999 XU_{39}	—	December 6, 1999	Socorro	LINEAR	V	1.7 km	MPC · JPL
45078	1999 XZ_{39}	—	December 6, 1999	Socorro	LINEAR	·	4.6 km	MPC · JPL
45079	1999 XZ_{41}	—	December 7, 1999	Socorro	LINEAR	MAR	5.9 km	MPC · JPL
45080	1999 XB_{43}	—	December 7, 1999	Socorro	LINEAR	·	2.3 km	MPC · JPL
45081	1999 XE_{44}	—	December 7, 1999	Socorro	LINEAR	·	2.2 km	MPC · JPL
45082	1999 XF_{44}	—	December 7, 1999	Socorro	LINEAR	V	2.7 km	MPC · JPL
45083	1999 XQ_{44}	—	December 7, 1999	Socorro	LINEAR	·	2.8 km	MPC · JPL
45084	1999 XG_{45}	—	December 7, 1999	Socorro	LINEAR	·	2.6 km	MPC · JPL
45085	1999 XH_{45}	—	December 7, 1999	Socorro	LINEAR	·	2.1 km	MPC · JPL
45086	1999 XE_{46}	—	December 7, 1999	Socorro	LINEAR	·	3.6 km	MPC · JPL
45087	1999 XM_{46}	—	December 7, 1999	Socorro	LINEAR	·	3.9 km	MPC · JPL
45088	1999 XX_{46}	—	December 7, 1999	Socorro	LINEAR	·	8.8 km	MPC · JPL
45089	1999 XA_{47}	—	December 7, 1999	Socorro	LINEAR	·	3.4 km	MPC · JPL
45090	1999 XA_{49}	—	December 7, 1999	Socorro	LINEAR	·	5.0 km	MPC · JPL
45091	1999 XT_{49}	—	December 7, 1999	Socorro	LINEAR	·	2.2 km	MPC · JPL
45092	1999 XD_{50}	—	December 7, 1999	Socorro	LINEAR	NYS	3.7 km	MPC · JPL
45093	1999 XF_{52}	—	December 7, 1999	Socorro	LINEAR	·	2.1 km	MPC · JPL
45094	1999 XX_{53}	—	December 7, 1999	Socorro	LINEAR	·	4.7 km	MPC · JPL
45095	1999 XE_{55}	—	December 7, 1999	Socorro	LINEAR	·	2.1 km	MPC · JPL
45096	1999 XE_{56}	—	December 7, 1999	Socorro	LINEAR	·	2.9 km	MPC · JPL
45097	1999 XL_{59}	—	December 7, 1999	Socorro	LINEAR	·	3.8 km	MPC · JPL
45098	1999 XK_{66}	—	December 7, 1999	Socorro	LINEAR	·	2.9 km	MPC · JPL
45099	1999 XN_{66}	—	December 7, 1999	Socorro	LINEAR	·	5.4 km	MPC · JPL
45100	1999 XZ_{66}	—	December 7, 1999	Socorro	LINEAR	·	5.1 km	MPC · JPL

== 45101–45200 ==
back to top

Designation			Discovery			Properties		Ref
Permanent	Provisional	Named after	Date	Site	Discoverer(s)	Category	Diam.	Ref
45101	1999 XA_{68}	—	December 7, 1999	Socorro	LINEAR	·	2.1 km	MPC · JPL
45102	1999 XN_{69}	—	December 7, 1999	Socorro	LINEAR	·	3.7 km	MPC · JPL
45103	1999 XJ_{70}	—	December 7, 1999	Socorro	LINEAR	·	6.9 km	MPC · JPL
45104	1999 XY_{73}	—	December 7, 1999	Socorro	LINEAR	NYS	4.7 km	MPC · JPL
45105	1999 XU_{74}	—	December 7, 1999	Socorro	LINEAR	·	8.7 km	MPC · JPL
45106	1999 XX_{74}	—	December 7, 1999	Socorro	LINEAR	·	11 km	MPC · JPL
45107	1999 XA_{75}	—	December 7, 1999	Socorro	LINEAR	NYS	3.6 km	MPC · JPL
45108	1999 XD_{76}	—	December 7, 1999	Socorro	LINEAR	·	10 km	MPC · JPL
45109	1999 XZ_{76}	—	December 7, 1999	Socorro	LINEAR	slow	10 km	MPC · JPL
45110	1999 XH_{77}	—	December 7, 1999	Socorro	LINEAR	·	3.3 km	MPC · JPL
45111	1999 XJ_{77}	—	December 7, 1999	Socorro	LINEAR	EOS	6.5 km	MPC · JPL
45112	1999 XG_{78}	—	December 7, 1999	Socorro	LINEAR	·	3.8 km	MPC · JPL
45113	1999 XZ_{78}	—	December 7, 1999	Socorro	LINEAR	·	2.0 km	MPC · JPL
45114	1999 XY_{81}	—	December 7, 1999	Socorro	LINEAR	·	3.3 km	MPC · JPL
45115	1999 XN_{82}	—	December 7, 1999	Socorro	LINEAR	NYS	3.0 km	MPC · JPL
45116	1999 XE_{83}	—	December 7, 1999	Socorro	LINEAR	(5)	2.7 km	MPC · JPL
45117	1999 XA_{85}	—	December 7, 1999	Socorro	LINEAR	DOR	6.1 km	MPC · JPL
45118	1999 XZ_{85}	—	December 7, 1999	Socorro	LINEAR	·	9.1 km	MPC · JPL
45119	1999 XA_{86}	—	December 7, 1999	Socorro	LINEAR	·	7.6 km	MPC · JPL
45120	1999 XX_{86}	—	December 7, 1999	Socorro	LINEAR	·	5.9 km	MPC · JPL
45121	1999 XZ_{86}	—	December 7, 1999	Socorro	LINEAR	·	5.9 km	MPC · JPL
45122	1999 XB_{88}	—	December 7, 1999	Socorro	LINEAR	EUN	3.2 km	MPC · JPL
45123	1999 XH_{88}	—	December 7, 1999	Socorro	LINEAR	GEF	5.1 km	MPC · JPL
45124	1999 XS_{88}	—	December 7, 1999	Socorro	LINEAR	·	5.3 km	MPC · JPL
45125	1999 XA_{89}	—	December 7, 1999	Socorro	LINEAR	·	3.2 km	MPC · JPL
45126	1999 XB_{89}	—	December 7, 1999	Socorro	LINEAR	EOS	5.8 km	MPC · JPL
45127	1999 XS_{89}	—	December 7, 1999	Socorro	LINEAR	EOS	4.7 km	MPC · JPL
45128	1999 XC_{91}	—	December 7, 1999	Socorro	LINEAR	MAS	2.1 km	MPC · JPL
45129	1999 XJ_{91}	—	December 7, 1999	Socorro	LINEAR	KOR	4.8 km	MPC · JPL
45130	1999 XQ_{91}	—	December 7, 1999	Socorro	LINEAR	·	4.9 km	MPC · JPL
45131	1999 XE_{92}	—	December 7, 1999	Socorro	LINEAR	·	4.1 km	MPC · JPL
45132	1999 XJ_{93}	—	December 7, 1999	Socorro	LINEAR	·	4.8 km	MPC · JPL
45133	1999 XM_{93}	—	December 7, 1999	Socorro	LINEAR	·	4.4 km	MPC · JPL
45134	1999 XN_{93}	—	December 7, 1999	Socorro	LINEAR	·	3.9 km	MPC · JPL
45135	1999 XN_{94}	—	December 7, 1999	Socorro	LINEAR	·	3.1 km	MPC · JPL
45136	1999 XO_{94}	—	December 7, 1999	Socorro	LINEAR	TIR	7.5 km	MPC · JPL
45137	1999 XH_{96}	—	December 7, 1999	Socorro	LINEAR	·	2.5 km	MPC · JPL
45138	1999 XC_{97}	—	December 7, 1999	Socorro	LINEAR	·	3.4 km	MPC · JPL
45139	1999 XP_{97}	—	December 7, 1999	Socorro	LINEAR	GEF	4.9 km	MPC · JPL
45140	1999 XW_{98}	—	December 7, 1999	Socorro	LINEAR	·	3.7 km	MPC · JPL
45141	1999 XZ_{100}	—	December 7, 1999	Socorro	LINEAR	·	2.6 km	MPC · JPL
45142	1999 XJ_{102}	—	December 7, 1999	Socorro	LINEAR	NYS	2.8 km	MPC · JPL
45143	1999 XO_{103}	—	December 7, 1999	Socorro	LINEAR	·	7.1 km	MPC · JPL
45144	1999 XA_{104}	—	December 7, 1999	Nachi-Katsuura	Y. Shimizu, T. Urata	·	6.2 km	MPC · JPL
45145	1999 XN_{105}	—	December 8, 1999	Nachi-Katsuura	Shiozawa, H., T. Urata	·	3.7 km	MPC · JPL
45146	1999 XC_{106}	—	December 11, 1999	Oizumi	T. Kobayashi	MAS	2.5 km	MPC · JPL
45147	1999 XA_{108}	—	December 4, 1999	Catalina	CSS	·	2.0 km	MPC · JPL
45148	1999 XD_{109}	—	December 4, 1999	Catalina	CSS	·	2.4 km	MPC · JPL
45149	1999 XN_{110}	—	December 5, 1999	Catalina	CSS	·	2.8 km	MPC · JPL
45150	1999 XP_{110}	—	December 5, 1999	Catalina	CSS	EUN	3.9 km	MPC · JPL
45151	1999 XB_{111}	—	December 5, 1999	Catalina	CSS	·	4.0 km	MPC · JPL
45152	1999 XO_{112}	—	December 11, 1999	Socorro	LINEAR	PHO	5.9 km	MPC · JPL
45153	1999 XD_{113}	—	December 11, 1999	Socorro	LINEAR	PHO	4.6 km	MPC · JPL
45154	1999 XL_{113}	—	December 11, 1999	Socorro	LINEAR	EUN	4.2 km	MPC · JPL
45155	1999 XW_{113}	—	December 11, 1999	Socorro	LINEAR	PHO	4.3 km	MPC · JPL
45156	1999 XV_{114}	—	December 11, 1999	Socorro	LINEAR	EUN	7.1 km	MPC · JPL
45157	1999 XA_{117}	—	December 5, 1999	Catalina	CSS	·	4.0 km	MPC · JPL
45158	1999 XJ_{117}	—	December 5, 1999	Catalina	CSS	·	2.3 km	MPC · JPL
45159	1999 XQ_{119}	—	December 5, 1999	Catalina	CSS	·	2.7 km	MPC · JPL
45160	1999 XS_{123}	—	December 7, 1999	Catalina	CSS	V	2.0 km	MPC · JPL
45161	1999 XX_{123}	—	December 7, 1999	Catalina	CSS	·	3.6 km	MPC · JPL
45162	1999 XX_{124}	—	December 7, 1999	Catalina	CSS	·	4.2 km	MPC · JPL
45163	1999 XE_{127}	—	December 9, 1999	Fountain Hills	C. W. Juels	·	5.1 km	MPC · JPL
45164	1999 XK_{127}	—	December 9, 1999	Fountain Hills	C. W. Juels	·	2.8 km	MPC · JPL
45165	1999 XS_{128}	—	December 10, 1999	Socorro	LINEAR	·	3.5 km	MPC · JPL
45166	1999 XZ_{128}	—	December 12, 1999	Socorro	LINEAR	·	1.8 km	MPC · JPL
45167	1999 XG_{129}	—	December 12, 1999	Socorro	LINEAR	·	3.6 km	MPC · JPL
45168	1999 XG_{130}	—	December 12, 1999	Socorro	LINEAR	·	2.4 km	MPC · JPL
45169	1999 XQ_{132}	—	December 12, 1999	Socorro	LINEAR	PHO	3.9 km	MPC · JPL
45170	1999 XF_{133}	—	December 12, 1999	Socorro	LINEAR	·	9.9 km	MPC · JPL
45171	1999 XB_{134}	—	December 12, 1999	Socorro	LINEAR	·	7.7 km	MPC · JPL
45172	1999 XG_{134}	—	December 12, 1999	Socorro	LINEAR	PHO	4.3 km	MPC · JPL
45173	1999 XU_{136}	—	December 14, 1999	Fountain Hills	C. W. Juels	·	1.7 km	MPC · JPL
45174	1999 XO_{137}	—	December 2, 1999	Anderson Mesa	LONEOS	·	2.2 km	MPC · JPL
45175	1999 XB_{140}	—	December 2, 1999	Kitt Peak	Spacewatch	·	2.4 km	MPC · JPL
45176	1999 XQ_{140}	—	December 2, 1999	Kitt Peak	Spacewatch	·	4.9 km	MPC · JPL
45177	1999 XS_{140}	—	December 2, 1999	Kitt Peak	Spacewatch	·	8.1 km	MPC · JPL
45178	1999 XW_{143}	—	December 13, 1999	Farpoint	G. Hug, G. Bell	·	3.2 km	MPC · JPL
45179	1999 XQ_{144}	—	December 15, 1999	Oohira	T. Urata	PHO	8.5 km	MPC · JPL
45180	1999 XK_{145}	—	December 7, 1999	Kitt Peak	Spacewatch	·	3.8 km	MPC · JPL
45181	1999 XZ_{146}	—	December 7, 1999	Kitt Peak	Spacewatch	·	1.8 km	MPC · JPL
45182	1999 XC_{147}	—	December 7, 1999	Kitt Peak	Spacewatch	·	2.7 km	MPC · JPL
45183	1999 XG_{153}	—	December 7, 1999	Socorro	LINEAR	NYS	2.0 km	MPC · JPL
45184	1999 XL_{155}	—	December 8, 1999	Socorro	LINEAR	·	6.2 km	MPC · JPL
45185	1999 XM_{157}	—	December 8, 1999	Socorro	LINEAR	·	2.5 km	MPC · JPL
45186	1999 XK_{158}	—	December 8, 1999	Socorro	LINEAR	·	2.6 km	MPC · JPL
45187	1999 XY_{158}	—	December 8, 1999	Socorro	LINEAR	PAD	6.4 km	MPC · JPL
45188	1999 XK_{159}	—	December 8, 1999	Socorro	LINEAR	·	3.2 km	MPC · JPL
45189	1999 XC_{160}	—	December 8, 1999	Socorro	LINEAR	EUN	4.8 km	MPC · JPL
45190	1999 XN_{161}	—	December 13, 1999	Socorro	LINEAR	·	2.9 km	MPC · JPL
45191	1999 XU_{163}	—	December 8, 1999	Catalina	CSS	·	10 km	MPC · JPL
45192	1999 XW_{163}	—	December 8, 1999	Catalina	CSS	·	4.4 km	MPC · JPL
45193	1999 XD_{165}	—	December 8, 1999	Socorro	LINEAR	·	3.7 km	MPC · JPL
45194	1999 XJ_{165}	—	December 8, 1999	Socorro	LINEAR	EUN	3.8 km	MPC · JPL
45195	1999 XT_{166}	—	December 10, 1999	Socorro	LINEAR	V	2.8 km	MPC · JPL
45196	1999 XV_{166}	—	December 10, 1999	Socorro	LINEAR	·	3.2 km	MPC · JPL
45197	1999 XY_{167}	—	December 10, 1999	Socorro	LINEAR	·	6.6 km	MPC · JPL
45198	1999 XF_{169}	—	December 10, 1999	Socorro	LINEAR	·	2.4 km	MPC · JPL
45199	1999 XF_{170}	—	December 10, 1999	Socorro	LINEAR	EUN	5.1 km	MPC · JPL
45200	1999 XS_{170}	—	December 10, 1999	Socorro	LINEAR	·	3.4 km	MPC · JPL

== 45201–45300 ==
back to top

Designation			Discovery			Properties		Ref
Permanent	Provisional	Named after	Date	Site	Discoverer(s)	Category	Diam.	Ref
45201	1999 XT_{170}	—	December 10, 1999	Socorro	LINEAR	·	5.2 km	MPC · JPL
45202	1999 XA_{171}	—	December 10, 1999	Socorro	LINEAR	·	5.9 km	MPC · JPL
45203	1999 XM_{171}	—	December 10, 1999	Socorro	LINEAR	·	2.8 km	MPC · JPL
45204	1999 XZ_{172}	—	December 10, 1999	Socorro	LINEAR	GEF	3.9 km	MPC · JPL
45205	1999 XJ_{173}	—	December 10, 1999	Socorro	LINEAR	·	5.4 km	MPC · JPL
45206	1999 XK_{174}	—	December 10, 1999	Socorro	LINEAR	·	7.0 km	MPC · JPL
45207	1999 XH_{175}	—	December 10, 1999	Socorro	LINEAR	·	8.6 km	MPC · JPL
45208	1999 XQ_{175}	—	December 10, 1999	Socorro	LINEAR	·	3.2 km	MPC · JPL
45209	1999 XT_{178}	—	December 10, 1999	Socorro	LINEAR	·	3.1 km	MPC · JPL
45210	1999 XW_{178}	—	December 10, 1999	Socorro	LINEAR	URS	9.0 km	MPC · JPL
45211	1999 XF_{179}	—	December 10, 1999	Socorro	LINEAR	GEF	3.0 km	MPC · JPL
45212	1999 XP_{180}	—	December 10, 1999	Socorro	LINEAR	EUN · slow	4.2 km	MPC · JPL
45213	1999 XS_{181}	—	December 12, 1999	Socorro	LINEAR	·	2.8 km	MPC · JPL
45214	1999 XW_{181}	—	December 12, 1999	Socorro	LINEAR	V	1.7 km	MPC · JPL
45215	1999 XB_{183}	—	December 12, 1999	Socorro	LINEAR	·	2.7 km	MPC · JPL
45216	1999 XP_{183}	—	December 12, 1999	Socorro	LINEAR	·	6.5 km	MPC · JPL
45217	1999 XL_{186}	—	December 12, 1999	Socorro	LINEAR	·	6.2 km	MPC · JPL
45218	1999 XQ_{186}	—	December 12, 1999	Socorro	LINEAR	·	3.3 km	MPC · JPL
45219	1999 XE_{187}	—	December 12, 1999	Socorro	LINEAR	PHO	3.6 km	MPC · JPL
45220	1999 XK_{188}	—	December 12, 1999	Socorro	LINEAR	V	2.6 km	MPC · JPL
45221	1999 XQ_{188}	—	December 12, 1999	Socorro	LINEAR	·	5.0 km	MPC · JPL
45222	1999 XY_{194}	—	December 12, 1999	Socorro	LINEAR	EUN	5.8 km	MPC · JPL
45223	1999 XF_{200}	—	December 12, 1999	Socorro	LINEAR	·	2.9 km	MPC · JPL
45224	1999 XO_{209}	—	December 13, 1999	Socorro	LINEAR	·	4.8 km	MPC · JPL
45225	1999 XZ_{212}	—	December 14, 1999	Socorro	LINEAR	·	2.6 km	MPC · JPL
45226	1999 XG_{213}	—	December 14, 1999	Socorro	LINEAR	·	2.3 km	MPC · JPL
45227	1999 XH_{213}	—	December 14, 1999	Socorro	LINEAR	·	2.4 km	MPC · JPL
45228	1999 XJ_{214}	—	December 14, 1999	Socorro	LINEAR	RAF	3.1 km	MPC · JPL
45229	1999 XS_{214}	—	December 14, 1999	Socorro	LINEAR	V	2.5 km	MPC · JPL
45230	1999 XV_{214}	—	December 14, 1999	Socorro	LINEAR	·	2.1 km	MPC · JPL
45231	1999 XT_{215}	—	December 14, 1999	Socorro	LINEAR	·	3.6 km	MPC · JPL
45232	1999 XZ_{215}	—	December 13, 1999	Kitt Peak	Spacewatch	ADE	7.5 km	MPC · JPL
45233	1999 XK_{216}	—	December 13, 1999	Kitt Peak	Spacewatch	·	5.4 km	MPC · JPL
45234	1999 XA_{228}	—	December 13, 1999	Anderson Mesa	LONEOS	·	2.8 km	MPC · JPL
45235	1999 XD_{228}	—	December 14, 1999	Kitt Peak	Spacewatch	EOS	5.3 km	MPC · JPL
45236	1999 XP_{229}	—	December 7, 1999	Catalina	CSS	V	1.9 km	MPC · JPL
45237	1999 XV_{229}	—	December 7, 1999	Catalina	CSS	V	1.5 km	MPC · JPL
45238	1999 XM_{230}	—	December 7, 1999	Anderson Mesa	LONEOS	(883)	2.8 km	MPC · JPL
45239	1999 XV_{231}	—	December 8, 1999	Socorro	LINEAR	GEF	3.8 km	MPC · JPL
45240	1999 XL_{233}	—	December 3, 1999	Socorro	LINEAR	EUN	3.5 km	MPC · JPL
45241	1999 XE_{238}	—	December 5, 1999	Anderson Mesa	LONEOS	·	2.8 km	MPC · JPL
45242	1999 XT_{241}	—	December 13, 1999	Anderson Mesa	LONEOS	V	1.4 km	MPC · JPL
45243	1999 XB_{242}	—	December 13, 1999	Catalina	CSS	·	3.4 km	MPC · JPL
45244	1999 XC_{242}	—	December 13, 1999	Catalina	CSS	·	3.4 km	MPC · JPL
45245	1999 XN_{242}	—	December 13, 1999	Catalina	CSS	·	4.8 km	MPC · JPL
45246	1999 XF_{245}	—	December 5, 1999	Socorro	LINEAR	·	4.3 km	MPC · JPL
45247	1999 XY_{245}	—	December 5, 1999	Socorro	LINEAR	·	2.7 km	MPC · JPL
45248	1999 XO_{258}	—	December 5, 1999	Anderson Mesa	LONEOS	·	7.5 km	MPC · JPL
45249	1999 XZ_{259}	—	December 7, 1999	Kitt Peak	Spacewatch	·	4.1 km	MPC · JPL
45250	1999 YJ	—	December 16, 1999	Socorro	LINEAR	·	5.7 km	MPC · JPL
45251	1999 YN	—	December 16, 1999	Socorro	LINEAR	·	4.7 km	MPC · JPL
45252	1999 YY_{1}	—	December 16, 1999	Kitt Peak	Spacewatch	·	2.4 km	MPC · JPL
45253	1999 YU_{4}	—	December 28, 1999	Farpoint	G. Hug, G. Bell	DOR	8.1 km	MPC · JPL
45254	1999 YS_{12}	—	December 27, 1999	Kitt Peak	Spacewatch	THM	9.3 km	MPC · JPL
45255	1999 YK_{13}	—	December 31, 1999	Farpoint	G. Hug, G. Bell	(3460)	7.2 km	MPC · JPL
45256	1999 YM_{13}	—	December 31, 1999	Socorro	LINEAR	PHO · slow	3.1 km	MPC · JPL
45257	1999 YC_{14}	—	December 31, 1999	Kitt Peak	Spacewatch	KOR	3.4 km	MPC · JPL
45258	1999 YG_{18}	—	December 18, 1999	Socorro	LINEAR	·	6.4 km	MPC · JPL
45259	2000 AF_{1}	—	January 2, 2000	Kitt Peak	Spacewatch	KOR	4.2 km	MPC · JPL
45260	2000 AY_{1}	—	January 2, 2000	Višnjan Observatory	K. Korlević	NAE	7.6 km	MPC · JPL
45261 Decoen	2000 AB_{2}	Decoen	January 2, 2000	Gnosca	S. Sposetti	·	3.2 km	MPC · JPL
45262	2000 AG_{2}	—	January 3, 2000	Gekko	T. Kagawa	NYS	3.2 km	MPC · JPL
45263	2000 AD_{5}	—	January 3, 2000	Chiyoda	T. Kojima	EUN	5.6 km	MPC · JPL
45264	2000 AL_{5}	—	January 4, 2000	Višnjan Observatory	K. Korlević	·	3.6 km	MPC · JPL
45265	2000 AY_{5}	—	January 4, 2000	Kitt Peak	Spacewatch	·	5.4 km	MPC · JPL
45266	2000 AK_{6}	—	January 4, 2000	Prescott	P. G. Comba	KOR	4.3 km	MPC · JPL
45267	2000 AK_{7}	—	January 2, 2000	Socorro	LINEAR	V	1.5 km	MPC · JPL
45268	2000 AM_{8}	—	January 2, 2000	Socorro	LINEAR	·	3.0 km	MPC · JPL
45269	2000 AR_{8}	—	January 2, 2000	Socorro	LINEAR	V	1.9 km	MPC · JPL
45270	2000 AT_{8}	—	January 2, 2000	Socorro	LINEAR	V	2.7 km	MPC · JPL
45271	2000 AO_{10}	—	January 3, 2000	Socorro	LINEAR	·	4.1 km	MPC · JPL
45272	2000 AC_{11}	—	January 3, 2000	Socorro	LINEAR	·	4.1 km	MPC · JPL
45273	2000 AF_{11}	—	January 3, 2000	Socorro	LINEAR	·	6.3 km	MPC · JPL
45274	2000 AN_{11}	—	January 3, 2000	Socorro	LINEAR	·	4.4 km	MPC · JPL
45275	2000 AK_{12}	—	January 3, 2000	Socorro	LINEAR	GEF	3.0 km	MPC · JPL
45276	2000 AO_{12}	—	January 3, 2000	Socorro	LINEAR	PAD	6.9 km	MPC · JPL
45277	2000 AE_{15}	—	January 3, 2000	Socorro	LINEAR	·	2.6 km	MPC · JPL
45278	2000 AL_{15}	—	January 3, 2000	Socorro	LINEAR	NYS	3.5 km	MPC · JPL
45279	2000 AS_{15}	—	January 3, 2000	Socorro	LINEAR	·	3.9 km	MPC · JPL
45280	2000 AE_{16}	—	January 3, 2000	Socorro	LINEAR	·	2.8 km	MPC · JPL
45281	2000 AA_{19}	—	January 3, 2000	Socorro	LINEAR	MAR	3.6 km	MPC · JPL
45282	2000 AL_{19}	—	January 3, 2000	Socorro	LINEAR	·	2.5 km	MPC · JPL
45283	2000 AU_{22}	—	January 3, 2000	Socorro	LINEAR	EUN	4.5 km	MPC · JPL
45284	2000 AO_{24}	—	January 3, 2000	Socorro	LINEAR	PAD	4.7 km	MPC · JPL
45285	2000 AO_{26}	—	January 3, 2000	Socorro	LINEAR	AGN	3.4 km	MPC · JPL
45286	2000 AC_{27}	—	January 3, 2000	Socorro	LINEAR	·	3.1 km	MPC · JPL
45287	2000 AB_{29}	—	January 3, 2000	Socorro	LINEAR	·	6.5 km	MPC · JPL
45288	2000 AP_{29}	—	January 3, 2000	Socorro	LINEAR	EOS	6.6 km	MPC · JPL
45289	2000 AY_{29}	—	January 3, 2000	Socorro	LINEAR	·	5.6 km	MPC · JPL
45290	2000 AG_{33}	—	January 3, 2000	Socorro	LINEAR	EUN	4.3 km	MPC · JPL
45291	2000 AS_{33}	—	January 3, 2000	Socorro	LINEAR	·	6.6 km	MPC · JPL
45292	2000 AX_{34}	—	January 3, 2000	Socorro	LINEAR	·	4.1 km	MPC · JPL
45293	2000 AA_{35}	—	January 3, 2000	Socorro	LINEAR	·	4.6 km	MPC · JPL
45294	2000 AF_{37}	—	January 3, 2000	Socorro	LINEAR	·	3.5 km	MPC · JPL
45295	2000 AN_{37}	—	January 3, 2000	Socorro	LINEAR	(5)	3.6 km	MPC · JPL
45296	2000 AZ_{37}	—	January 3, 2000	Socorro	LINEAR	(17392)	3.9 km	MPC · JPL
45297	2000 AN_{38}	—	January 3, 2000	Socorro	LINEAR	·	2.4 km	MPC · JPL
45298 Williamon	2000 AE_{42}	Williamon	January 5, 2000	Kitt Peak	Block, A.	·	5.2 km	MPC · JPL
45299 Stivell	2000 AL_{43}	Stivell	January 6, 2000	Kleť	M. Tichý	(5)	2.5 km	MPC · JPL
45300 Thewrewk	2000 AF_{45}	Thewrewk	January 1, 2000	Piszkéstető	K. Sárneczky, L. Kiss	EOS	13 km	MPC · JPL

== 45301–45400 ==
back to top

Designation			Discovery			Properties		Ref
Permanent	Provisional	Named after	Date	Site	Discoverer(s)	Category	Diam.	Ref
45301	2000 AW_{45}	—	January 3, 2000	Socorro	LINEAR	EOS	5.0 km	MPC · JPL
45302	2000 AX_{46}	—	January 4, 2000	Socorro	LINEAR	NYS	2.2 km	MPC · JPL
45303	2000 AP_{47}	—	January 4, 2000	Socorro	LINEAR	KOR	4.2 km	MPC · JPL
45304	2000 AQ_{47}	—	January 4, 2000	Socorro	LINEAR	·	3.3 km	MPC · JPL
45305 Paulscherrer	2000 AH_{48}	Paulscherrer	January 4, 2000	Gnosca	S. Sposetti	MAR	2.3 km	MPC · JPL
45306	2000 AC_{50}	—	January 5, 2000	Višnjan Observatory	K. Korlević	HYG	9.2 km	MPC · JPL
45307	2000 AO_{50}	—	January 6, 2000	Višnjan Observatory	K. Korlević	EOS	8.8 km	MPC · JPL
45308	2000 AR_{53}	—	January 4, 2000	Socorro	LINEAR	·	4.1 km	MPC · JPL
45309	2000 AO_{54}	—	January 4, 2000	Socorro	LINEAR	NYS	1.9 km	MPC · JPL
45310	2000 AX_{55}	—	January 4, 2000	Socorro	LINEAR	·	2.5 km	MPC · JPL
45311	2000 AK_{56}	—	January 4, 2000	Socorro	LINEAR	slow	3.6 km	MPC · JPL
45312	2000 AE_{57}	—	January 4, 2000	Socorro	LINEAR	·	4.9 km	MPC · JPL
45313	2000 AU_{59}	—	January 4, 2000	Socorro	LINEAR	·	6.0 km	MPC · JPL
45314	2000 AP_{60}	—	January 4, 2000	Socorro	LINEAR	·	3.0 km	MPC · JPL
45315	2000 AJ_{61}	—	January 4, 2000	Socorro	LINEAR	NYS	3.8 km	MPC · JPL
45316	2000 AR_{61}	—	January 4, 2000	Socorro	LINEAR	·	5.7 km	MPC · JPL
45317	2000 AC_{63}	—	January 4, 2000	Socorro	LINEAR	EOS	4.9 km	MPC · JPL
45318	2000 AG_{63}	—	January 4, 2000	Socorro	LINEAR	TEL	4.4 km	MPC · JPL
45319	2000 AQ_{63}	—	January 4, 2000	Socorro	LINEAR	EUN	4.6 km	MPC · JPL
45320	2000 AT_{63}	—	January 4, 2000	Socorro	LINEAR	EUN	4.0 km	MPC · JPL
45321	2000 AD_{66}	—	January 4, 2000	Socorro	LINEAR	·	1.8 km	MPC · JPL
45322	2000 AT_{67}	—	January 4, 2000	Socorro	LINEAR	PAD	4.9 km	MPC · JPL
45323	2000 AF_{68}	—	January 5, 2000	Socorro	LINEAR	·	2.9 km	MPC · JPL
45324	2000 AG_{69}	—	January 5, 2000	Socorro	LINEAR	·	3.2 km	MPC · JPL
45325	2000 AD_{70}	—	January 5, 2000	Socorro	LINEAR	·	6.5 km	MPC · JPL
45326	2000 AE_{72}	—	January 5, 2000	Socorro	LINEAR	·	2.8 km	MPC · JPL
45327	2000 AE_{74}	—	January 5, 2000	Socorro	LINEAR	·	3.6 km	MPC · JPL
45328	2000 AM_{74}	—	January 5, 2000	Socorro	LINEAR	·	3.0 km	MPC · JPL
45329	2000 AX_{74}	—	January 5, 2000	Socorro	LINEAR	·	3.6 km	MPC · JPL
45330	2000 AN_{76}	—	January 5, 2000	Socorro	LINEAR	·	3.1 km	MPC · JPL
45331	2000 AZ_{76}	—	January 5, 2000	Socorro	LINEAR	·	6.6 km	MPC · JPL
45332	2000 AM_{79}	—	January 5, 2000	Socorro	LINEAR	·	3.2 km	MPC · JPL
45333	2000 AR_{81}	—	January 5, 2000	Socorro	LINEAR	·	6.8 km	MPC · JPL
45334	2000 AX_{81}	—	January 5, 2000	Socorro	LINEAR	KOR	4.0 km	MPC · JPL
45335	2000 AA_{83}	—	January 5, 2000	Socorro	LINEAR	·	2.7 km	MPC · JPL
45336	2000 AC_{83}	—	January 5, 2000	Socorro	LINEAR	GEF	3.0 km	MPC · JPL
45337	2000 AK_{83}	—	January 5, 2000	Socorro	LINEAR	NYS	3.6 km	MPC · JPL
45338 Ericevans	2000 AT_{85}	Ericevans	January 5, 2000	Socorro	LINEAR	·	11 km	MPC · JPL
45339	2000 AV_{85}	—	January 5, 2000	Socorro	LINEAR	(5)	3.4 km	MPC · JPL
45340	2000 AG_{86}	—	January 5, 2000	Socorro	LINEAR	GEF	4.1 km	MPC · JPL
45341	2000 AX_{86}	—	January 5, 2000	Socorro	LINEAR	·	3.3 km	MPC · JPL
45342	2000 AP_{87}	—	January 5, 2000	Socorro	LINEAR	·	5.9 km	MPC · JPL
45343	2000 AJ_{88}	—	January 5, 2000	Socorro	LINEAR	·	3.6 km	MPC · JPL
45344	2000 AK_{90}	—	January 5, 2000	Socorro	LINEAR	EOS	6.6 km	MPC · JPL
45345	2000 AD_{91}	—	January 5, 2000	Socorro	LINEAR	·	8.5 km	MPC · JPL
45346	2000 AL_{91}	—	January 5, 2000	Socorro	LINEAR	·	5.0 km	MPC · JPL
45347	2000 AS_{91}	—	January 5, 2000	Socorro	LINEAR	·	8.3 km	MPC · JPL
45348	2000 AZ_{91}	—	January 5, 2000	Socorro	LINEAR	·	3.5 km	MPC · JPL
45349	2000 AP_{93}	—	January 5, 2000	Socorro	LINEAR	·	3.5 km	MPC · JPL
45350	2000 AD_{95}	—	January 4, 2000	Socorro	LINEAR	·	12 km	MPC · JPL
45351	2000 AF_{96}	—	January 4, 2000	Socorro	LINEAR	GEF	4.4 km	MPC · JPL
45352	2000 AC_{97}	—	January 4, 2000	Socorro	LINEAR	ADE	12 km	MPC · JPL
45353	2000 AZ_{98}	—	January 5, 2000	Socorro	LINEAR	NYS	4.5 km	MPC · JPL
45354	2000 AS_{99}	—	January 5, 2000	Socorro	LINEAR	V	2.5 km	MPC · JPL
45355	2000 AF_{100}	—	January 5, 2000	Socorro	LINEAR	·	3.9 km	MPC · JPL
45356	2000 AA_{102}	—	January 5, 2000	Socorro	LINEAR	·	3.5 km	MPC · JPL
45357	2000 AC_{102}	—	January 5, 2000	Socorro	LINEAR	·	4.0 km	MPC · JPL
45358	2000 AM_{102}	—	January 5, 2000	Socorro	LINEAR	·	2.1 km	MPC · JPL
45359	2000 AN_{102}	—	January 5, 2000	Socorro	LINEAR	·	3.2 km	MPC · JPL
45360	2000 AW_{102}	—	January 5, 2000	Socorro	LINEAR	·	2.6 km	MPC · JPL
45361	2000 AZ_{102}	—	January 5, 2000	Socorro	LINEAR	·	3.9 km	MPC · JPL
45362	2000 AH_{103}	—	January 5, 2000	Socorro	LINEAR	·	4.9 km	MPC · JPL
45363	2000 AF_{104}	—	January 5, 2000	Socorro	LINEAR	·	6.4 km	MPC · JPL
45364	2000 AW_{104}	—	January 5, 2000	Socorro	LINEAR	V	1.3 km	MPC · JPL
45365	2000 AM_{106}	—	January 5, 2000	Socorro	LINEAR	MAR	4.0 km	MPC · JPL
45366	2000 AN_{107}	—	January 5, 2000	Socorro	LINEAR	EOS	8.7 km	MPC · JPL
45367	2000 AG_{108}	—	January 5, 2000	Socorro	LINEAR	GEF	3.2 km	MPC · JPL
45368	2000 AU_{109}	—	January 5, 2000	Socorro	LINEAR	·	4.3 km	MPC · JPL
45369	2000 AM_{110}	—	January 5, 2000	Socorro	LINEAR	NYS	2.2 km	MPC · JPL
45370	2000 AA_{111}	—	January 5, 2000	Socorro	LINEAR	KOR	4.4 km	MPC · JPL
45371	2000 AA_{112}	—	January 5, 2000	Socorro	LINEAR	·	3.6 km	MPC · JPL
45372	2000 AT_{113}	—	January 5, 2000	Socorro	LINEAR	·	5.7 km	MPC · JPL
45373	2000 AW_{113}	—	January 5, 2000	Socorro	LINEAR	·	3.8 km	MPC · JPL
45374	2000 AL_{114}	—	January 5, 2000	Socorro	LINEAR	ADE	7.2 km	MPC · JPL
45375	2000 AZ_{115}	—	January 5, 2000	Socorro	LINEAR	·	4.5 km	MPC · JPL
45376	2000 AP_{117}	—	January 5, 2000	Socorro	LINEAR	·	4.8 km	MPC · JPL
45377	2000 AX_{117}	—	January 5, 2000	Socorro	LINEAR	KRM ·	4.0 km	MPC · JPL
45378	2000 AD_{118}	—	January 5, 2000	Socorro	LINEAR	VER	15 km	MPC · JPL
45379	2000 AT_{120}	—	January 5, 2000	Socorro	LINEAR	·	5.1 km	MPC · JPL
45380	2000 AW_{120}	—	January 5, 2000	Socorro	LINEAR	EOS	5.8 km	MPC · JPL
45381	2000 AN_{122}	—	January 5, 2000	Socorro	LINEAR	HYG	12 km	MPC · JPL
45382	2000 AV_{123}	—	January 5, 2000	Socorro	LINEAR	EOS	5.3 km	MPC · JPL
45383	2000 AP_{124}	—	January 5, 2000	Socorro	LINEAR	·	2.6 km	MPC · JPL
45384	2000 AB_{125}	—	January 5, 2000	Socorro	LINEAR	(16286)	4.3 km	MPC · JPL
45385	2000 AF_{125}	—	January 5, 2000	Socorro	LINEAR	EUN	3.9 km	MPC · JPL
45386	2000 AO_{125}	—	January 5, 2000	Socorro	LINEAR	EOS	5.0 km	MPC · JPL
45387	2000 AW_{125}	—	January 5, 2000	Socorro	LINEAR	·	5.2 km	MPC · JPL
45388	2000 AB_{127}	—	January 5, 2000	Socorro	LINEAR	EOS	6.6 km	MPC · JPL
45389	2000 AP_{128}	—	January 5, 2000	Socorro	LINEAR	·	7.0 km	MPC · JPL
45390	2000 AW_{128}	—	January 5, 2000	Socorro	LINEAR	NAE	10 km	MPC · JPL
45391	2000 AA_{129}	—	January 5, 2000	Socorro	LINEAR	EOS	4.9 km	MPC · JPL
45392	2000 AR_{129}	—	January 5, 2000	Socorro	LINEAR	EUN	4.6 km	MPC · JPL
45393	2000 AU_{130}	—	January 6, 2000	Socorro	LINEAR	·	3.3 km	MPC · JPL
45394	2000 AO_{132}	—	January 3, 2000	Socorro	LINEAR	·	8.3 km	MPC · JPL
45395	2000 AQ_{134}	—	January 4, 2000	Socorro	LINEAR	·	6.1 km	MPC · JPL
45396	2000 AS_{138}	—	January 5, 2000	Socorro	LINEAR	·	4.3 km	MPC · JPL
45397	2000 AW_{138}	—	January 5, 2000	Socorro	LINEAR	·	6.8 km	MPC · JPL
45398	2000 AH_{139}	—	January 5, 2000	Socorro	LINEAR	·	3.2 km	MPC · JPL
45399	2000 AW_{139}	—	January 5, 2000	Socorro	LINEAR	·	2.8 km	MPC · JPL
45400	2000 AW_{140}	—	January 5, 2000	Socorro	LINEAR	·	6.9 km	MPC · JPL

== 45401–45500 ==
back to top

Designation			Discovery			Properties		Ref
Permanent	Provisional	Named after	Date	Site	Discoverer(s)	Category	Diam.	Ref
45401	2000 AX_{140}	—	January 5, 2000	Socorro	LINEAR	·	4.2 km	MPC · JPL
45402	2000 AZ_{140}	—	January 5, 2000	Socorro	LINEAR	·	3.9 km	MPC · JPL
45403	2000 AL_{141}	—	January 5, 2000	Socorro	LINEAR	EUN	7.0 km	MPC · JPL
45404	2000 AP_{141}	—	January 5, 2000	Socorro	LINEAR	·	6.1 km	MPC · JPL
45405	2000 AY_{141}	—	January 5, 2000	Socorro	LINEAR	·	3.9 km	MPC · JPL
45406	2000 AG_{142}	—	January 5, 2000	Socorro	LINEAR	EUN	3.6 km	MPC · JPL
45407	2000 AJ_{142}	—	January 5, 2000	Socorro	LINEAR	·	4.6 km	MPC · JPL
45408	2000 AO_{142}	—	January 5, 2000	Socorro	LINEAR	EOS	8.2 km	MPC · JPL
45409	2000 AT_{143}	—	January 5, 2000	Socorro	LINEAR	EOS	6.3 km	MPC · JPL
45410	2000 AA_{144}	—	January 5, 2000	Socorro	LINEAR	EOS	8.0 km	MPC · JPL
45411	2000 AN_{144}	—	January 5, 2000	Socorro	LINEAR	·	5.7 km	MPC · JPL
45412	2000 AN_{147}	—	January 5, 2000	Socorro	LINEAR	·	6.0 km	MPC · JPL
45413	2000 AY_{147}	—	January 5, 2000	Socorro	LINEAR	V	2.2 km	MPC · JPL
45414	2000 AE_{149}	—	January 7, 2000	Socorro	LINEAR	·	3.1 km	MPC · JPL
45415	2000 AN_{149}	—	January 7, 2000	Socorro	LINEAR	·	5.3 km	MPC · JPL
45416	2000 AX_{151}	—	January 8, 2000	Socorro	LINEAR	·	1.9 km	MPC · JPL
45417	2000 AZ_{151}	—	January 8, 2000	Socorro	LINEAR	·	4.6 km	MPC · JPL
45418	2000 AV_{155}	—	January 3, 2000	Socorro	LINEAR	·	2.2 km	MPC · JPL
45419	2000 AV_{158}	—	January 3, 2000	Socorro	LINEAR	·	3.2 km	MPC · JPL
45420	2000 AG_{159}	—	January 3, 2000	Socorro	LINEAR	·	4.8 km	MPC · JPL
45421	2000 AL_{159}	—	January 3, 2000	Socorro	LINEAR	·	5.2 km	MPC · JPL
45422	2000 AG_{162}	—	January 4, 2000	Socorro	LINEAR	·	4.2 km	MPC · JPL
45423	2000 AR_{162}	—	January 4, 2000	Socorro	LINEAR	EUN	6.7 km	MPC · JPL
45424	2000 AY_{164}	—	January 7, 2000	Socorro	LINEAR	·	3.7 km	MPC · JPL
45425	2000 AY_{166}	—	January 8, 2000	Socorro	LINEAR	·	9.4 km	MPC · JPL
45426	2000 AZ_{166}	—	January 8, 2000	Socorro	LINEAR	·	3.4 km	MPC · JPL
45427	2000 AA_{167}	—	January 8, 2000	Socorro	LINEAR	INA	10 km	MPC · JPL
45428	2000 AN_{167}	—	January 8, 2000	Socorro	LINEAR	·	4.5 km	MPC · JPL
45429	2000 AO_{169}	—	January 7, 2000	Socorro	LINEAR	EUN	2.8 km	MPC · JPL
45430	2000 AW_{169}	—	January 7, 2000	Socorro	LINEAR	RAF	2.8 km	MPC · JPL
45431	2000 AR_{170}	—	January 7, 2000	Socorro	LINEAR	·	3.5 km	MPC · JPL
45432	2000 AQ_{172}	—	January 7, 2000	Socorro	LINEAR	·	2.8 km	MPC · JPL
45433	2000 AA_{173}	—	January 7, 2000	Socorro	LINEAR	·	3.1 km	MPC · JPL
45434	2000 AX_{173}	—	January 7, 2000	Socorro	LINEAR	·	4.1 km	MPC · JPL
45435	2000 AF_{174}	—	January 7, 2000	Socorro	LINEAR	·	2.2 km	MPC · JPL
45436	2000 AD_{176}	—	January 7, 2000	Socorro	LINEAR	·	3.9 km	MPC · JPL
45437	2000 AF_{177}	—	January 7, 2000	Socorro	LINEAR	ADE	5.7 km	MPC · JPL
45438	2000 AJ_{177}	—	January 7, 2000	Socorro	LINEAR	V	2.1 km	MPC · JPL
45439	2000 AO_{177}	—	January 7, 2000	Socorro	LINEAR	·	7.2 km	MPC · JPL
45440	2000 AQ_{177}	—	January 7, 2000	Socorro	LINEAR	ADE	9.9 km	MPC · JPL
45441	2000 AX_{177}	—	January 7, 2000	Socorro	LINEAR	GEF	3.7 km	MPC · JPL
45442	2000 AK_{179}	—	January 7, 2000	Socorro	LINEAR	·	3.5 km	MPC · JPL
45443	2000 AR_{179}	—	January 7, 2000	Socorro	LINEAR	·	12 km	MPC · JPL
45444	2000 AD_{180}	—	January 7, 2000	Socorro	LINEAR	·	3.4 km	MPC · JPL
45445	2000 AR_{181}	—	January 7, 2000	Socorro	LINEAR	·	6.7 km	MPC · JPL
45446	2000 AX_{186}	—	January 8, 2000	Socorro	LINEAR	·	3.7 km	MPC · JPL
45447	2000 AH_{188}	—	January 8, 2000	Socorro	LINEAR	·	3.8 km	MPC · JPL
45448	2000 AJ_{188}	—	January 8, 2000	Socorro	LINEAR	·	3.9 km	MPC · JPL
45449	2000 AQ_{188}	—	January 8, 2000	Socorro	LINEAR	·	7.0 km	MPC · JPL
45450	2000 AC_{191}	—	January 8, 2000	Socorro	LINEAR	MAR	4.9 km	MPC · JPL
45451	2000 AJ_{191}	—	January 8, 2000	Socorro	LINEAR	·	6.9 km	MPC · JPL
45452	2000 AZ_{191}	—	January 8, 2000	Socorro	LINEAR	·	4.3 km	MPC · JPL
45453	2000 AB_{193}	—	January 8, 2000	Socorro	LINEAR	(10654)	16 km	MPC · JPL
45454	2000 AC_{193}	—	January 8, 2000	Socorro	LINEAR	·	4.6 km	MPC · JPL
45455	2000 AB_{195}	—	January 8, 2000	Socorro	LINEAR	EOS	6.8 km	MPC · JPL
45456	2000 AD_{195}	—	January 8, 2000	Socorro	LINEAR	EUN	5.2 km	MPC · JPL
45457	2000 AL_{195}	—	January 8, 2000	Socorro	LINEAR	·	4.4 km	MPC · JPL
45458	2000 AZ_{195}	—	January 8, 2000	Socorro	LINEAR	·	5.4 km	MPC · JPL
45459	2000 AM_{196}	—	January 8, 2000	Socorro	LINEAR	·	9.4 km	MPC · JPL
45460	2000 AS_{197}	—	January 8, 2000	Socorro	LINEAR	PHO · slow	6.5 km	MPC · JPL
45461	2000 AW_{197}	—	January 8, 2000	Socorro	LINEAR	·	4.4 km	MPC · JPL
45462	2000 AZ_{197}	—	January 8, 2000	Socorro	LINEAR	·	5.6 km	MPC · JPL
45463	2000 AL_{198}	—	January 8, 2000	Socorro	LINEAR	·	9.8 km	MPC · JPL
45464	2000 AV_{198}	—	January 8, 2000	Socorro	LINEAR	EOS	8.5 km	MPC · JPL
45465	2000 AN_{200}	—	January 9, 2000	Socorro	LINEAR	·	8.5 km	MPC · JPL
45466	2000 AZ_{201}	—	January 9, 2000	Socorro	LINEAR	EOS	8.4 km	MPC · JPL
45467	2000 AK_{203}	—	January 10, 2000	Socorro	LINEAR	EUN	6.2 km	MPC · JPL
45468	2000 AL_{203}	—	January 10, 2000	Socorro	LINEAR	·	15 km	MPC · JPL
45469	2000 AY_{203}	—	January 10, 2000	Socorro	LINEAR	·	5.2 km	MPC · JPL
45470	2000 AZ_{203}	—	January 10, 2000	Socorro	LINEAR	MAR	4.7 km	MPC · JPL
45471	2000 AG_{204}	—	January 13, 2000	Kleť	Kleť	·	4.5 km	MPC · JPL
45472	2000 AJ_{208}	—	January 4, 2000	Kitt Peak	Spacewatch	NYS	2.2 km	MPC · JPL
45473	2000 AG_{212}	—	January 5, 2000	Kitt Peak	Spacewatch	(21344)	6.3 km	MPC · JPL
45474	2000 AW_{215}	—	January 7, 2000	Kitt Peak	Spacewatch	KOR	4.7 km	MPC · JPL
45475	2000 AN_{216}	—	January 8, 2000	Kitt Peak	Spacewatch	·	3.1 km	MPC · JPL
45476	2000 AU_{226}	—	January 9, 2000	Kitt Peak	Spacewatch	·	4.0 km	MPC · JPL
45477	2000 AA_{227}	—	January 9, 2000	Kitt Peak	Spacewatch	·	3.8 km	MPC · JPL
45478	2000 AS_{230}	—	January 3, 2000	Kitt Peak	Spacewatch	AGN	2.8 km	MPC · JPL
45479	2000 AZ_{231}	—	January 4, 2000	Socorro	LINEAR	·	6.1 km	MPC · JPL
45480	2000 AH_{233}	—	January 4, 2000	Kitt Peak	Spacewatch	·	7.5 km	MPC · JPL
45481	2000 AK_{233}	—	January 4, 2000	Socorro	LINEAR	·	12 km	MPC · JPL
45482	2000 AU_{233}	—	January 5, 2000	Socorro	LINEAR	V	1.9 km	MPC · JPL
45483	2000 AP_{235}	—	January 5, 2000	Socorro	LINEAR	·	7.2 km	MPC · JPL
45484	2000 AV_{235}	—	January 5, 2000	Socorro	LINEAR	·	3.8 km	MPC · JPL
45485	2000 AS_{236}	—	January 5, 2000	Socorro	LINEAR	·	6.1 km	MPC · JPL
45486	2000 AF_{237}	—	January 5, 2000	Socorro	LINEAR	·	4.7 km	MPC · JPL
45487	2000 AR_{237}	—	January 5, 2000	Socorro	LINEAR	EUN	7.0 km	MPC · JPL
45488	2000 AD_{238}	—	January 6, 2000	Socorro	LINEAR	·	2.4 km	MPC · JPL
45489	2000 AW_{239}	—	January 6, 2000	Anderson Mesa	LONEOS	·	4.6 km	MPC · JPL
45490	2000 AV_{240}	—	January 7, 2000	Anderson Mesa	LONEOS	HNS	3.8 km	MPC · JPL
45491	2000 AB_{241}	—	January 7, 2000	Anderson Mesa	LONEOS	·	3.4 km	MPC · JPL
45492 Sławomirbreiter	2000 AD_{241}	Sławomirbreiter	January 7, 2000	Anderson Mesa	LONEOS	MAR	3.2 km	MPC · JPL
45493	2000 AE_{241}	—	January 7, 2000	Socorro	LINEAR	·	6.3 km	MPC · JPL
45494	2000 AT_{242}	—	January 7, 2000	Socorro	LINEAR	·	5.4 km	MPC · JPL
45495	2000 AF_{243}	—	January 7, 2000	Anderson Mesa	LONEOS	MAR	4.4 km	MPC · JPL
45496	2000 AO_{245}	—	January 10, 2000	Socorro	LINEAR	·	13 km	MPC · JPL
45497	2000 AB_{248}	—	January 2, 2000	Socorro	LINEAR	EUN	5.0 km	MPC · JPL
45498	2000 BH	—	January 23, 2000	Olathe	Olathe	·	2.9 km	MPC · JPL
45499	2000 BV_{2}	—	January 16, 2000	Višnjan Observatory	K. Korlević	MAR	3.6 km	MPC · JPL
45500 Motegi	2000 BN_{3}	Motegi	January 27, 2000	Oizumi	T. Kobayashi	THM	7.9 km	MPC · JPL

== 45501–45600 ==
back to top

Designation			Discovery			Properties		Ref
Permanent	Provisional	Named after	Date	Site	Discoverer(s)	Category	Diam.	Ref
45501	2000 BQ_{3}	—	January 27, 2000	Oizumi	T. Kobayashi	·	7.8 km	MPC · JPL
45502	2000 BZ_{8}	—	January 29, 2000	Socorro	LINEAR	URS	17 km	MPC · JPL
45503	2000 BE_{15}	—	January 31, 2000	Oizumi	T. Kobayashi	·	6.2 km	MPC · JPL
45504	2000 BX_{15}	—	January 29, 2000	Socorro	LINEAR	MAR	4.3 km	MPC · JPL
45505	2000 BE_{17}	—	January 30, 2000	Socorro	LINEAR	NYS	2.8 km	MPC · JPL
45506	2000 BN_{17}	—	January 30, 2000	Socorro	LINEAR	(5)	3.2 km	MPC · JPL
45507	2000 BM_{18}	—	January 30, 2000	Socorro	LINEAR	·	4.2 km	MPC · JPL
45508	2000 BN_{18}	—	January 30, 2000	Socorro	LINEAR	KOR	3.5 km	MPC · JPL
45509 Robertward	2000 BZ_{22}	Robertward	January 30, 2000	Catalina	CSS	·	4.2 km	MPC · JPL
45510 Kashuba	2000 BB_{23}	Kashuba	January 30, 2000	Catalina	CSS	EOS	5.3 km	MPC · JPL
45511 Anneblack	2000 BC_{23}	Anneblack	January 30, 2000	Catalina	CSS	CYB · 2:1J	9.9 km	MPC · JPL
45512 Holcomb	2000 BD_{23}	Holcomb	January 30, 2000	Catalina	CSS	EOS	4.8 km	MPC · JPL
45513	2000 BR_{23}	—	January 27, 2000	Socorro	LINEAR	EUP	9.9 km	MPC · JPL
45514	2000 BV_{23}	—	January 29, 2000	Socorro	LINEAR	·	4.4 km	MPC · JPL
45515	2000 BF_{25}	—	January 30, 2000	Socorro	LINEAR	THM	11 km	MPC · JPL
45516	2000 BE_{28}	—	January 31, 2000	Socorro	LINEAR	·	3.6 km	MPC · JPL
45517 Jett	2000 BE_{31}	Jett	January 30, 2000	Catalina	CSS	·	3.7 km	MPC · JPL
45518 Larrykrozel	2000 BO_{33}	Larrykrozel	January 30, 2000	Catalina	CSS	·	4.7 km	MPC · JPL
45519 Triebold	2000 BS_{33}	Triebold	January 30, 2000	Catalina	CSS	·	8.1 km	MPC · JPL
45520	2000 BS_{35}	—	January 31, 2000	Socorro	LINEAR	EUN	3.5 km	MPC · JPL
45521	2000 BP_{39}	—	January 27, 2000	Kitt Peak	Spacewatch	·	7.3 km	MPC · JPL
45522	2000 BP_{47}	—	January 31, 2000	Socorro	LINEAR	KOR	4.1 km	MPC · JPL
45523	2000 BU_{47}	—	January 27, 2000	Kitt Peak	Spacewatch	·	7.6 km	MPC · JPL
45524	2000 CL_{2}	—	February 2, 2000	Oizumi	T. Kobayashi	NAE	9.1 km	MPC · JPL
45525	2000 CC_{4}	—	February 2, 2000	Socorro	LINEAR	·	2.9 km	MPC · JPL
45526	2000 CG_{4}	—	February 2, 2000	Socorro	LINEAR	NYS	3.3 km	MPC · JPL
45527	2000 CN_{5}	—	February 2, 2000	Socorro	LINEAR	·	4.9 km	MPC · JPL
45528	2000 CF_{9}	—	February 2, 2000	Socorro	LINEAR	EOS	5.1 km	MPC · JPL
45529	2000 CJ_{11}	—	February 2, 2000	Socorro	LINEAR	EUN	5.2 km	MPC · JPL
45530	2000 CP_{12}	—	February 2, 2000	Socorro	LINEAR	EOS	5.3 km	MPC · JPL
45531	2000 CM_{14}	—	February 2, 2000	Socorro	LINEAR	·	3.6 km	MPC · JPL
45532	2000 CE_{21}	—	February 2, 2000	Socorro	LINEAR	V	1.8 km	MPC · JPL
45533	2000 CH_{23}	—	February 2, 2000	Socorro	LINEAR	·	8.8 km	MPC · JPL
45534	2000 CD_{25}	—	February 2, 2000	Socorro	LINEAR	GEF	4.0 km	MPC · JPL
45535	2000 CK_{25}	—	February 2, 2000	Socorro	LINEAR	·	4.3 km	MPC · JPL
45536	2000 CK_{27}	—	February 2, 2000	Socorro	LINEAR	SYL · CYB	11 km	MPC · JPL
45537	2000 CG_{28}	—	February 2, 2000	Socorro	LINEAR	·	6.5 km	MPC · JPL
45538	2000 CG_{29}	—	February 2, 2000	Socorro	LINEAR	EOS	4.8 km	MPC · JPL
45539	2000 CM_{32}	—	February 2, 2000	Socorro	LINEAR	KOR	3.7 km	MPC · JPL
45540	2000 CY_{33}	—	February 4, 2000	Višnjan Observatory	K. Korlević	EUN	4.0 km	MPC · JPL
45541	2000 CW_{35}	—	February 2, 2000	Socorro	LINEAR	·	7.8 km	MPC · JPL
45542	2000 CE_{36}	—	February 2, 2000	Socorro	LINEAR	EUN	4.7 km	MPC · JPL
45543	2000 CQ_{36}	—	February 2, 2000	Socorro	LINEAR	·	6.2 km	MPC · JPL
45544	2000 CS_{36}	—	February 2, 2000	Socorro	LINEAR	·	8.4 km	MPC · JPL
45545	2000 CA_{38}	—	February 3, 2000	Socorro	LINEAR	·	9.0 km	MPC · JPL
45546	2000 CE_{41}	—	February 6, 2000	Prescott	P. G. Comba	·	7.6 km	MPC · JPL
45547	2000 CB_{43}	—	February 2, 2000	Socorro	LINEAR	·	4.3 km	MPC · JPL
45548	2000 CF_{43}	—	February 2, 2000	Socorro	LINEAR	·	5.5 km	MPC · JPL
45549	2000 CY_{44}	—	February 2, 2000	Socorro	LINEAR	·	3.5 km	MPC · JPL
45550	2000 CX_{46}	—	February 2, 2000	Socorro	LINEAR	·	8.7 km	MPC · JPL
45551	2000 CF_{47}	—	February 2, 2000	Socorro	LINEAR	·	3.0 km	MPC · JPL
45552	2000 CQ_{47}	—	February 2, 2000	Socorro	LINEAR	EOS	6.1 km	MPC · JPL
45553	2000 CO_{48}	—	February 2, 2000	Socorro	LINEAR	EUN	3.8 km	MPC · JPL
45554	2000 CX_{48}	—	February 2, 2000	Socorro	LINEAR	BRA	4.9 km	MPC · JPL
45555	2000 CF_{50}	—	February 2, 2000	Socorro	LINEAR	·	2.9 km	MPC · JPL
45556	2000 CM_{51}	—	February 2, 2000	Socorro	LINEAR	HYG · fast	9.4 km	MPC · JPL
45557	2000 CV_{51}	—	February 2, 2000	Socorro	LINEAR	·	10 km	MPC · JPL
45558	2000 CR_{52}	—	February 2, 2000	Socorro	LINEAR	EOS	6.0 km	MPC · JPL
45559	2000 CB_{53}	—	February 2, 2000	Socorro	LINEAR	·	4.2 km	MPC · JPL
45560	2000 CW_{53}	—	February 2, 2000	Socorro	LINEAR	EUN	3.2 km	MPC · JPL
45561	2000 CA_{56}	—	February 4, 2000	Socorro	LINEAR	·	6.6 km	MPC · JPL
45562	2000 CD_{56}	—	February 4, 2000	Socorro	LINEAR	·	5.0 km	MPC · JPL
45563	2000 CS_{56}	—	February 4, 2000	Socorro	LINEAR	·	7.9 km	MPC · JPL
45564	2000 CV_{56}	—	February 4, 2000	Socorro	LINEAR	EOS	4.5 km	MPC · JPL
45565	2000 CD_{57}	—	February 5, 2000	Socorro	LINEAR	·	6.0 km	MPC · JPL
45566	2000 CK_{58}	—	February 5, 2000	Socorro	LINEAR	·	18 km	MPC · JPL
45567	2000 CQ_{60}	—	February 2, 2000	Socorro	LINEAR	·	11 km	MPC · JPL
45568	2000 CL_{62}	—	February 2, 2000	Socorro	LINEAR	·	14 km	MPC · JPL
45569	2000 CK_{63}	—	February 2, 2000	Socorro	LINEAR	·	7.3 km	MPC · JPL
45570	2000 CQ_{63}	—	February 2, 2000	Socorro	LINEAR	·	5.7 km	MPC · JPL
45571	2000 CZ_{64}	—	February 3, 2000	Socorro	LINEAR	·	3.5 km	MPC · JPL
45572	2000 CR_{71}	—	February 7, 2000	Socorro	LINEAR	·	8.5 km	MPC · JPL
45573	2000 CZ_{72}	—	February 2, 2000	Socorro	LINEAR	·	4.4 km	MPC · JPL
45574	2000 CE_{73}	—	February 7, 2000	Kitt Peak	Spacewatch	·	8.6 km	MPC · JPL
45575	2000 CC_{75}	—	February 8, 2000	Socorro	LINEAR	·	3.9 km	MPC · JPL
45576	2000 CD_{75}	—	February 10, 2000	Črni Vrh	Mikuž, H.	EOS	6.1 km	MPC · JPL
45577	2000 CT_{76}	—	February 10, 2000	Višnjan Observatory	K. Korlević	·	4.4 km	MPC · JPL
45578	2000 CL_{77}	—	February 8, 2000	Prescott	P. G. Comba	·	5.4 km	MPC · JPL
45579	2000 CE_{80}	—	February 8, 2000	Kitt Peak	Spacewatch	VER	8.3 km	MPC · JPL
45580 Renéracine	2000 CB_{81}	Renéracine	February 10, 2000	Val-des-Bois	Bergeron, D.	HOF	6.6 km	MPC · JPL
45581	2000 CN_{82}	—	February 4, 2000	Socorro	LINEAR	GEF	3.3 km	MPC · JPL
45582	2000 CH_{83}	—	February 4, 2000	Socorro	LINEAR	AGN	4.5 km	MPC · JPL
45583	2000 CK_{87}	—	February 4, 2000	Socorro	LINEAR	DOR	13 km	MPC · JPL
45584	2000 CY_{88}	—	February 4, 2000	Socorro	LINEAR	·	9.2 km	MPC · JPL
45585	2000 CA_{89}	—	February 4, 2000	Socorro	LINEAR	·	12 km	MPC · JPL
45586	2000 CC_{91}	—	February 6, 2000	Socorro	LINEAR	KOR	4.9 km	MPC · JPL
45587	2000 CT_{91}	—	February 6, 2000	Socorro	LINEAR	THM	9.0 km	MPC · JPL
45588	2000 CP_{92}	—	February 6, 2000	Socorro	LINEAR	·	6.3 km	MPC · JPL
45589	2000 CM_{97}	—	February 13, 2000	Višnjan Observatory	K. Korlević	THM	9.2 km	MPC · JPL
45590	2000 CU_{101}	—	February 14, 2000	Črni Vrh	Mikuž, H.	VER	10 km	MPC · JPL
45591	2000 CQ_{103}	—	February 8, 2000	Socorro	LINEAR	·	15 km	MPC · JPL
45592	2000 CS_{103}	—	February 8, 2000	Socorro	LINEAR	EOS	7.2 km	MPC · JPL
45593	2000 CT_{103}	—	February 8, 2000	Socorro	LINEAR	EOS	6.4 km	MPC · JPL
45594 Wendyrichard	2000 CJ_{111}	Wendyrichard	February 6, 2000	Catalina	CSS	ADE	3.9 km	MPC · JPL
45595 Inman	2000 CK_{111}	Inman	February 6, 2000	Catalina	CSS	·	3.4 km	MPC · JPL
45596 Molliesugden	2000 CF_{112}	Molliesugden	February 7, 2000	Catalina	CSS	·	4.1 km	MPC · JPL
45597	2000 CK_{120}	—	February 2, 2000	Socorro	LINEAR	·	8.0 km	MPC · JPL
45598	2000 CN_{120}	—	February 3, 2000	Socorro	LINEAR	·	2.9 km	MPC · JPL
45599	2000 DJ_{3}	—	February 27, 2000	Višnjan Observatory	K. Korlević, M. Jurić	·	12 km	MPC · JPL
45600	2000 DD_{4}	—	February 28, 2000	Socorro	LINEAR	EUN	5.3 km	MPC · JPL

== 45601–45700 ==
back to top

Designation			Discovery			Properties		Ref
Permanent	Provisional	Named after	Date	Site	Discoverer(s)	Category	Diam.	Ref
45601	2000 DE_{5}	—	February 28, 2000	Socorro	LINEAR	EOS	5.9 km	MPC · JPL
45602	2000 DX_{17}	—	February 28, 2000	Črni Vrh	Skvarč, J.	·	15 km	MPC · JPL
45603	2000 DC_{18}	—	February 28, 2000	Socorro	LINEAR	·	4.1 km	MPC · JPL
45604	2000 DH_{24}	—	February 29, 2000	Socorro	LINEAR	·	4.7 km	MPC · JPL
45605	2000 DM_{28}	—	February 29, 2000	Socorro	LINEAR	HYG	10 km	MPC · JPL
45606	2000 DE_{32}	—	February 29, 2000	Socorro	LINEAR	·	7.8 km	MPC · JPL
45607	2000 DG_{36}	—	February 29, 2000	Socorro	LINEAR	·	7.1 km	MPC · JPL
45608	2000 DZ_{41}	—	February 29, 2000	Socorro	LINEAR	·	3.9 km	MPC · JPL
45609	2000 DN_{46}	—	February 29, 2000	Socorro	LINEAR	TEL	5.3 km	MPC · JPL
45610	2000 DJ_{48}	—	February 29, 2000	Socorro	LINEAR	KOR	3.9 km	MPC · JPL
45611	2000 DV_{54}	—	February 29, 2000	Socorro	LINEAR	·	7.8 km	MPC · JPL
45612	2000 DB_{59}	—	February 29, 2000	Socorro	LINEAR	KOR	3.8 km	MPC · JPL
45613	2000 DJ_{59}	—	February 29, 2000	Socorro	LINEAR	KOR	4.3 km	MPC · JPL
45614	2000 DA_{63}	—	February 29, 2000	Socorro	LINEAR	·	4.0 km	MPC · JPL
45615	2000 DG_{63}	—	February 29, 2000	Socorro	LINEAR	GEF	2.3 km	MPC · JPL
45616	2000 DN_{66}	—	February 29, 2000	Socorro	LINEAR	·	4.7 km	MPC · JPL
45617	2000 DY_{71}	—	February 29, 2000	Socorro	LINEAR	EMA	5.1 km	MPC · JPL
45618	2000 DO_{72}	—	February 29, 2000	Socorro	LINEAR	·	8.8 km	MPC · JPL
45619	2000 DS_{78}	—	February 29, 2000	Socorro	LINEAR	·	11 km	MPC · JPL
45620	2000 DY_{80}	—	February 28, 2000	Socorro	LINEAR	EOS	4.6 km	MPC · JPL
45621	2000 DL_{87}	—	February 29, 2000	Socorro	LINEAR	·	6.2 km	MPC · JPL
45622	2000 DN_{87}	—	February 29, 2000	Socorro	LINEAR	·	3.9 km	MPC · JPL
45623	2000 DT_{93}	—	February 28, 2000	Socorro	LINEAR	VER	8.8 km	MPC · JPL
45624	2000 DY_{93}	—	February 28, 2000	Socorro	LINEAR	·	4.8 km	MPC · JPL
45625	2000 DE_{95}	—	February 28, 2000	Socorro	LINEAR	EOS	6.2 km	MPC · JPL
45626	2000 DF_{95}	—	February 28, 2000	Socorro	LINEAR	·	9.0 km	MPC · JPL
45627	2000 DY_{97}	—	February 29, 2000	Socorro	LINEAR	EUN	4.1 km	MPC · JPL
45628	2000 DD_{99}	—	February 29, 2000	Socorro	LINEAR	KOR	3.0 km	MPC · JPL
45629	2000 DT_{99}	—	February 29, 2000	Socorro	LINEAR	VER	12 km	MPC · JPL
45630	2000 DO_{101}	—	February 29, 2000	Socorro	LINEAR	·	11 km	MPC · JPL
45631	2000 DY_{105}	—	February 29, 2000	Socorro	LINEAR	·	10 km	MPC · JPL
45632	2000 DS_{106}	—	February 29, 2000	Socorro	LINEAR	·	6.0 km	MPC · JPL
45633	2000 EY_{1}	—	March 3, 2000	Socorro	LINEAR	KOR	3.4 km	MPC · JPL
45634	2000 EH_{11}	—	March 4, 2000	Socorro	LINEAR	·	4.6 km	MPC · JPL
45635	2000 EY_{11}	—	March 4, 2000	Socorro	LINEAR	·	7.1 km	MPC · JPL
45636	2000 EG_{12}	—	March 4, 2000	Socorro	LINEAR	EOS	6.0 km	MPC · JPL
45637	2000 EW_{12}	—	March 4, 2000	Socorro	LINEAR	(45637) · CYB	9.6 km	MPC · JPL
45638 Teske	2000 EK_{20}	Teske	March 3, 2000	Catalina	CSS	·	3.7 km	MPC · JPL
45639 Tomney	2000 EP_{20}	Tomney	March 3, 2000	Catalina	CSS	·	14 km	MPC · JPL
45640 Mikepuzio	2000 ED_{21}	Mikepuzio	March 3, 2000	Catalina	CSS	·	4.6 km	MPC · JPL
45641 Larrypuzio	2000 EK_{21}	Larrypuzio	March 3, 2000	Catalina	CSS	·	3.6 km	MPC · JPL
45642	2000 EU_{34}	—	March 5, 2000	Socorro	LINEAR	EOS	5.6 km	MPC · JPL
45643	2000 EG_{37}	—	March 8, 2000	Socorro	LINEAR	·	6.0 km	MPC · JPL
45644	2000 EU_{37}	—	March 8, 2000	Socorro	LINEAR	HYG	8.9 km	MPC · JPL
45645	2000 EY_{41}	—	March 8, 2000	Socorro	LINEAR	THM	9.3 km	MPC · JPL
45646	2000 EE_{45}	—	March 9, 2000	Socorro	LINEAR	·	7.7 km	MPC · JPL
45647	2000 EF_{46}	—	March 9, 2000	Socorro	LINEAR	·	7.7 km	MPC · JPL
45648	2000 ED_{47}	—	March 9, 2000	Socorro	LINEAR	(1298)	14 km	MPC · JPL
45649	2000 EN_{49}	—	March 9, 2000	Socorro	LINEAR	EOS	6.3 km	MPC · JPL
45650	2000 EV_{49}	—	March 6, 2000	Višnjan Observatory	K. Korlević	·	4.8 km	MPC · JPL
45651	2000 EK_{60}	—	March 10, 2000	Socorro	LINEAR	·	7.0 km	MPC · JPL
45652	2000 EK_{61}	—	March 10, 2000	Socorro	LINEAR	CYB	7.8 km	MPC · JPL
45653	2000 EL_{62}	—	March 10, 2000	Socorro	LINEAR	SYL · CYB	10 km	MPC · JPL
45654	2000 EV_{71}	—	March 10, 2000	Kitt Peak	Spacewatch	KOR	2.1 km	MPC · JPL
45655	2000 EW_{71}	—	March 10, 2000	Kitt Peak	Spacewatch	EUN	2.1 km	MPC · JPL
45656	2000 EN_{74}	—	March 10, 2000	Kitt Peak	Spacewatch	slow	6.4 km	MPC · JPL
45657	2000 EK_{76}	—	March 5, 2000	Socorro	LINEAR	·	7.6 km	MPC · JPL
45658	2000 EA_{80}	—	March 5, 2000	Socorro	LINEAR	EOS	5.8 km	MPC · JPL
45659	2000 EL_{84}	—	March 6, 2000	Socorro	LINEAR	EOS	7.0 km	MPC · JPL
45660	2000 EU_{84}	—	March 8, 2000	Socorro	LINEAR	·	6.2 km	MPC · JPL
45661	2000 EX_{84}	—	March 8, 2000	Socorro	LINEAR	EUN	4.2 km	MPC · JPL
45662	2000 EY_{84}	—	March 8, 2000	Socorro	LINEAR	·	6.6 km	MPC · JPL
45663	2000 EF_{85}	—	March 8, 2000	Socorro	LINEAR	EOS	6.1 km	MPC · JPL
45664	2000 EC_{88}	—	March 9, 2000	Socorro	LINEAR	·	8.1 km	MPC · JPL
45665	2000 EM_{88}	—	March 9, 2000	Socorro	LINEAR	EOS	7.5 km	MPC · JPL
45666	2000 EX_{91}	—	March 9, 2000	Socorro	LINEAR	URS	10 km	MPC · JPL
45667	2000 EG_{93}	—	March 9, 2000	Socorro	LINEAR	VER	11 km	MPC · JPL
45668	2000 EU_{94}	—	March 9, 2000	Socorro	LINEAR	·	9.1 km	MPC · JPL
45669	2000 ET_{96}	—	March 10, 2000	Socorro	LINEAR	·	6.5 km	MPC · JPL
45670	2000 EK_{103}	—	March 12, 2000	Socorro	LINEAR	TIR	6.9 km	MPC · JPL
45671	2000 EA_{104}	—	March 14, 2000	Socorro	LINEAR	EOS	9.7 km	MPC · JPL
45672	2000 EE_{109}	—	March 8, 2000	Haleakala	NEAT	slow	12 km	MPC · JPL
45673	2000 ES_{111}	—	March 9, 2000	Kitt Peak	Spacewatch	THM	6.4 km	MPC · JPL
45674	2000 EY_{111}	—	March 9, 2000	Socorro	LINEAR	·	7.4 km	MPC · JPL
45675	2000 EG_{112}	—	March 9, 2000	Socorro	LINEAR	·	7.0 km	MPC · JPL
45676	2000 EG_{117}	—	March 10, 2000	Haleakala	NEAT	·	5.8 km	MPC · JPL
45677	2000 EJ_{120}	—	March 11, 2000	Anderson Mesa	LONEOS	·	11 km	MPC · JPL
45678	2000 EQ_{127}	—	March 11, 2000	Anderson Mesa	LONEOS	·	6.5 km	MPC · JPL
45679	2000 EZ_{127}	—	March 11, 2000	Anderson Mesa	LONEOS	·	6.5 km	MPC · JPL
45680	2000 EF_{130}	—	March 11, 2000	Anderson Mesa	LONEOS	·	12 km	MPC · JPL
45681	2000 ET_{131}	—	March 11, 2000	Anderson Mesa	LONEOS	·	10 km	MPC · JPL
45682	2000 EX_{131}	—	March 11, 2000	Anderson Mesa	LONEOS	EOS	6.7 km	MPC · JPL
45683	2000 EO_{135}	—	March 11, 2000	Anderson Mesa	LONEOS	·	4.7 km	MPC · JPL
45684	2000 EE_{137}	—	March 13, 2000	Socorro	LINEAR	·	6.8 km	MPC · JPL
45685 Torrycoppin	2000 EA_{139}	Torrycoppin	March 11, 2000	Catalina	CSS	·	9.7 km	MPC · JPL
45686	2000 EM_{139}	—	March 11, 2000	Anderson Mesa	LONEOS	·	7.3 km	MPC · JPL
45687 Pranverahyseni	2000 EK_{140}	Pranverahyseni	March 1, 2000	Catalina	CSS	·	13 km	MPC · JPL
45688 Lawrencestacey	2000 EV_{142}	Lawrencestacey	March 3, 2000	Catalina	CSS	ADE	6.1 km	MPC · JPL
45689 Brianjones	2000 EC_{144}	Brianjones	March 3, 2000	Catalina	CSS	·	6.3 km	MPC · JPL
45690 Janiradebaugh	2000 EL_{146}	Janiradebaugh	March 4, 2000	Catalina	CSS	EUN	4.2 km	MPC · JPL
45691	2000 EF_{148}	—	March 4, 2000	Catalina	CSS	VER	11 km	MPC · JPL
45692 Poshyachinda	2000 EJ_{148}	Poshyachinda	March 4, 2000	Catalina	CSS	·	4.1 km	MPC · JPL
45693	2000 EB_{150}	—	March 5, 2000	Socorro	LINEAR	·	4.7 km	MPC · JPL
45694	2000 EC_{150}	—	March 5, 2000	Haleakala	NEAT	·	4.7 km	MPC · JPL
45695	2000 ET_{150}	—	March 5, 2000	Haleakala	NEAT	KOR	4.1 km	MPC · JPL
45696	2000 EM_{167}	—	March 4, 2000	Socorro	LINEAR	EOS	7.0 km	MPC · JPL
45697	2000 EP_{174}	—	March 5, 2000	Socorro	LINEAR	·	4.2 km	MPC · JPL
45698	2000 EG_{197}	—	March 4, 2000	Socorro	LINEAR	·	2.4 km	MPC · JPL
45699 Maryalba	2000 EO_{199}	Maryalba	March 1, 2000	Catalina	CSS	·	4.7 km	MPC · JPL
45700 Levi-Setti	2000 EP_{204}	Levi-Setti	March 3, 2000	Catalina	CSS	EUN	4.1 km	MPC · JPL

== 45701–45800 ==
back to top

Designation			Discovery			Properties		Ref
Permanent	Provisional	Named after	Date	Site	Discoverer(s)	Category	Diam.	Ref
45701	2000 FE_{11}	—	March 28, 2000	Socorro	LINEAR	EOS	6.7 km	MPC · JPL
45702	2000 FJ_{15}	—	March 29, 2000	Socorro	LINEAR	PHO	4.1 km	MPC · JPL
45703	2000 FH_{19}	—	March 29, 2000	Socorro	LINEAR	·	5.3 km	MPC · JPL
45704	2000 FZ_{19}	—	March 29, 2000	Socorro	LINEAR	fast	5.7 km	MPC · JPL
45705	2000 FD_{31}	—	March 28, 2000	Socorro	LINEAR	·	5.6 km	MPC · JPL
45706	2000 FT_{31}	—	March 29, 2000	Socorro	LINEAR	EOS	7.6 km	MPC · JPL
45707	2000 FZ_{31}	—	March 29, 2000	Socorro	LINEAR	·	6.6 km	MPC · JPL
45708	2000 FD_{35}	—	March 29, 2000	Socorro	LINEAR	·	6.2 km	MPC · JPL
45709	2000 FR_{36}	—	March 29, 2000	Socorro	LINEAR	CYB	12 km	MPC · JPL
45710	2000 FD_{40}	—	March 29, 2000	Socorro	LINEAR	·	5.3 km	MPC · JPL
45711	2000 FD_{43}	—	March 28, 2000	Socorro	LINEAR	·	3.4 km	MPC · JPL
45712	2000 FR_{44}	—	March 29, 2000	Socorro	LINEAR	·	6.8 km	MPC · JPL
45713	2000 FK_{51}	—	March 29, 2000	Kitt Peak	Spacewatch	THM	6.2 km	MPC · JPL
45714	2000 FV_{58}	—	March 26, 2000	Anderson Mesa	LONEOS	EOS	6.3 km	MPC · JPL
45715	2000 FR_{66}	—	March 25, 2000	Kitt Peak	Spacewatch	·	2.6 km	MPC · JPL
45716	2000 GK_{8}	—	April 5, 2000	Socorro	LINEAR	THM	9.0 km	MPC · JPL
45717	2000 GZ_{11}	—	April 5, 2000	Socorro	LINEAR	HYG	6.0 km	MPC · JPL
45718	2000 GO_{21}	—	April 5, 2000	Socorro	LINEAR	·	8.2 km	MPC · JPL
45719	2000 GR_{26}	—	April 5, 2000	Socorro	LINEAR	·	8.3 km	MPC · JPL
45720	2000 GZ_{33}	—	April 5, 2000	Socorro	LINEAR	fast	7.9 km	MPC · JPL
45721	2000 GZ_{42}	—	April 5, 2000	Socorro	LINEAR	3:2	8.5 km	MPC · JPL
45722	2000 GA_{56}	—	April 5, 2000	Socorro	LINEAR	TEL	5.2 km	MPC · JPL
45723	2000 GN_{58}	—	April 5, 2000	Socorro	LINEAR	·	8.4 km	MPC · JPL
45724	2000 GJ_{68}	—	April 5, 2000	Socorro	LINEAR	EOS	6.0 km	MPC · JPL
45725	2000 GJ_{77}	—	April 5, 2000	Socorro	LINEAR	·	4.2 km	MPC · JPL
45726	2000 GL_{83}	—	April 3, 2000	Socorro	LINEAR	·	8.6 km	MPC · JPL
45727	2000 GQ_{83}	—	April 3, 2000	Socorro	LINEAR	VER	8.7 km	MPC · JPL
45728	2000 GC_{86}	—	April 4, 2000	Socorro	LINEAR	·	9.4 km	MPC · JPL
45729	2000 GB_{89}	—	April 4, 2000	Socorro	LINEAR	GEF	4.8 km	MPC · JPL
45730	2000 GS_{106}	—	April 7, 2000	Socorro	LINEAR	EOS	7.2 km	MPC · JPL
45731	2000 GM_{124}	—	April 7, 2000	Socorro	LINEAR	·	5.0 km	MPC · JPL
45732	2000 GL_{136}	—	April 12, 2000	Socorro	LINEAR	EOS	6.8 km	MPC · JPL
45733	2000 GV_{139}	—	April 4, 2000	Anderson Mesa	LONEOS	EOS	6.1 km	MPC · JPL
45734	2000 GN_{140}	—	April 4, 2000	Anderson Mesa	LONEOS	HYG	11 km	MPC · JPL
45735	2000 GC_{159}	—	April 7, 2000	Socorro	LINEAR	·	13 km	MPC · JPL
45736	2000 GA_{170}	—	April 4, 2000	Anderson Mesa	LONEOS	·	3.2 km	MPC · JPL
45737 Benita	2000 HB	Benita	April 22, 2000	Boca Raton	Segal, B. A.	·	5.1 km	MPC · JPL
45738	2000 HY_{19}	—	April 27, 2000	Kitt Peak	Spacewatch	·	13 km	MPC · JPL
45739	2000 HR_{25}	—	April 24, 2000	Anderson Mesa	LONEOS	T_{j} (2.95)	16 km	MPC · JPL
45740	2000 HG_{27}	—	April 27, 2000	Socorro	LINEAR	·	7.4 km	MPC · JPL
45741	2000 HT_{33}	—	April 24, 2000	Anderson Mesa	LONEOS	·	6.4 km	MPC · JPL
45742	2000 HJ_{44}	—	April 26, 2000	Anderson Mesa	LONEOS	·	5.9 km	MPC · JPL
45743	2000 HR_{53}	—	April 29, 2000	Socorro	LINEAR	EOS	6.4 km	MPC · JPL
45744	2000 HU_{57}	—	April 24, 2000	Anderson Mesa	LONEOS	GEF	3.9 km	MPC · JPL
45745	2000 HU_{84}	—	April 30, 2000	Haleakala	NEAT	·	9.3 km	MPC · JPL
45746	2000 JW_{14}	—	May 6, 2000	Socorro	LINEAR	·	6.0 km	MPC · JPL
45747	2000 JR_{38}	—	May 7, 2000	Socorro	LINEAR	·	4.6 km	MPC · JPL
45748	2000 JD_{62}	—	May 7, 2000	Socorro	LINEAR	·	2.8 km	MPC · JPL
45749	2000 JR_{64}	—	May 4, 2000	Anderson Mesa	LONEOS	TIR	4.6 km	MPC · JPL
45750	2000 JC_{65}	—	May 5, 2000	Socorro	LINEAR	·	8.2 km	MPC · JPL
45751	2000 JH_{66}	—	May 6, 2000	Socorro	LINEAR	·	5.8 km	MPC · JPL
45752 Venditti	2000 JY_{70}	Venditti	May 1, 2000	Anderson Mesa	LONEOS	EOS · slow	6.6 km	MPC · JPL
45753	2000 JL_{72}	—	May 1, 2000	Kitt Peak	Spacewatch	·	8.3 km	MPC · JPL
45754	2000 KC_{14}	—	May 28, 2000	Socorro	LINEAR	(5)	3.4 km	MPC · JPL
45755	2000 KL_{18}	—	May 28, 2000	Socorro	LINEAR	KOR	4.3 km	MPC · JPL
45756	2000 KV_{26}	—	May 28, 2000	Socorro	LINEAR	·	5.9 km	MPC · JPL
45757	2000 KH_{29}	—	May 28, 2000	Socorro	LINEAR	·	3.9 km	MPC · JPL
45758	2000 KN_{29}	—	May 28, 2000	Socorro	LINEAR	·	8.8 km	MPC · JPL
45759	2000 KQ_{41}	—	May 27, 2000	Socorro	LINEAR	·	6.3 km	MPC · JPL
45760	2000 KY_{43}	—	May 30, 2000	Ondřejov	P. Kušnirák	·	3.8 km	MPC · JPL
45761	2000 KF_{45}	—	May 30, 2000	Kitt Peak	Spacewatch	·	3.1 km	MPC · JPL
45762	2000 KK_{76}	—	May 27, 2000	Socorro	LINEAR	·	3.6 km	MPC · JPL
45763	2000 KB_{77}	—	May 27, 2000	Socorro	LINEAR	·	4.4 km	MPC · JPL
45764	2000 LV	—	June 2, 2000	Reedy Creek	J. Broughton	·	4.5 km	MPC · JPL
45765	2000 LJ_{3}	—	June 4, 2000	Socorro	LINEAR	GEF	4.1 km	MPC · JPL
45766	2000 LX_{5}	—	June 6, 2000	Reedy Creek	J. Broughton	EOS	6.3 km	MPC · JPL
45767	2000 LU_{17}	—	June 8, 2000	Socorro	LINEAR	·	6.5 km	MPC · JPL
45768	2000 LF_{28}	—	June 6, 2000	Anderson Mesa	LONEOS	·	2.8 km	MPC · JPL
45769	2000 LP_{36}	—	June 1, 2000	Haleakala	NEAT	·	4.0 km	MPC · JPL
45770	2000 NM_{2}	—	July 5, 2000	Prescott	P. G. Comba	·	4.0 km	MPC · JPL
45771	2000 NE_{5}	—	July 7, 2000	Socorro	LINEAR	V	3.1 km	MPC · JPL
45772	2000 NR_{16}	—	July 5, 2000	Anderson Mesa	LONEOS	·	2.4 km	MPC · JPL
45773	2000 NL_{22}	—	July 7, 2000	Anderson Mesa	LONEOS	·	4.6 km	MPC · JPL
45774	2000 NH_{24}	—	July 4, 2000	Anderson Mesa	LONEOS	EUN	4.8 km	MPC · JPL
45775	2000 NP_{27}	—	July 4, 2000	Anderson Mesa	LONEOS	·	4.4 km	MPC · JPL
45776	2000 NZ_{28}	—	July 2, 2000	Kitt Peak	Spacewatch	·	5.7 km	MPC · JPL
45777	2000 OZ_{4}	—	July 24, 2000	Socorro	LINEAR	EUN	3.8 km	MPC · JPL
45778	2000 OG_{5}	—	July 24, 2000	Socorro	LINEAR	·	4.4 km	MPC · JPL
45779	2000 OR_{6}	—	July 29, 2000	Socorro	LINEAR	·	3.8 km	MPC · JPL
45780	2000 OA_{12}	—	July 23, 2000	Socorro	LINEAR	·	3.7 km	MPC · JPL
45781	2000 OD_{12}	—	July 23, 2000	Socorro	LINEAR	·	3.7 km	MPC · JPL
45782	2000 OE_{14}	—	July 23, 2000	Socorro	LINEAR	·	2.7 km	MPC · JPL
45783	2000 OV_{16}	—	July 23, 2000	Socorro	LINEAR	NYS	3.1 km	MPC · JPL
45784	2000 OZ_{17}	—	July 23, 2000	Socorro	LINEAR	(5)	3.9 km	MPC · JPL
45785	2000 OT_{19}	—	July 30, 2000	Socorro	LINEAR	·	2.4 km	MPC · JPL
45786	2000 OE_{20}	—	July 30, 2000	Socorro	LINEAR	GEF	3.1 km	MPC · JPL
45787	2000 OJ_{24}	—	July 23, 2000	Socorro	LINEAR	V	3.1 km	MPC · JPL
45788	2000 OH_{25}	—	July 23, 2000	Socorro	LINEAR	·	2.9 km	MPC · JPL
45789	2000 OZ_{26}	—	July 23, 2000	Socorro	LINEAR	NYS	4.6 km	MPC · JPL
45790	2000 ON_{42}	—	July 30, 2000	Socorro	LINEAR	·	2.5 km	MPC · JPL
45791	2000 OD_{45}	—	July 30, 2000	Socorro	LINEAR	·	6.4 km	MPC · JPL
45792	2000 OF_{45}	—	July 30, 2000	Socorro	LINEAR	V	2.4 km	MPC · JPL
45793	2000 OL_{48}	—	July 31, 2000	Socorro	LINEAR	·	2.5 km	MPC · JPL
45794	2000 OM_{48}	—	July 31, 2000	Socorro	LINEAR	MAS	2.6 km	MPC · JPL
45795	2000 OY_{49}	—	July 31, 2000	Socorro	LINEAR	V	2.1 km	MPC · JPL
45796	2000 OG_{54}	—	July 29, 2000	Anderson Mesa	LONEOS	·	6.6 km	MPC · JPL
45797	2000 PK_{1}	—	August 1, 2000	Socorro	LINEAR	·	2.0 km	MPC · JPL
45798	2000 PH_{16}	—	August 1, 2000	Socorro	LINEAR	·	3.4 km	MPC · JPL
45799	2000 PZ_{18}	—	August 1, 2000	Socorro	LINEAR	·	2.2 km	MPC · JPL
45800	2000 PB_{22}	—	August 1, 2000	Socorro	LINEAR	THB	8.8 km	MPC · JPL

== 45801–45900 ==
back to top

Designation			Discovery			Properties		Ref
Permanent	Provisional	Named after	Date	Site	Discoverer(s)	Category	Diam.	Ref
45801	2000 PF_{28}	—	August 4, 2000	Haleakala	NEAT	·	2.6 km	MPC · JPL
45802	2000 PV_{29}	—	August 5, 2000	Mauna Kea	M. J. Holman	cubewano (cold)	90 km	MPC · JPL
45803	2000 QH_{1}	—	August 23, 2000	Reedy Creek	J. Broughton	·	3.3 km	MPC · JPL
45804	2000 QP_{2}	—	August 24, 2000	Socorro	LINEAR	·	2.6 km	MPC · JPL
45805	2000 QU_{18}	—	August 24, 2000	Socorro	LINEAR	·	2.6 km	MPC · JPL
45806	2000 QN_{20}	—	August 24, 2000	Socorro	LINEAR	·	2.7 km	MPC · JPL
45807	2000 QY_{20}	—	August 24, 2000	Socorro	LINEAR	·	2.2 km	MPC · JPL
45808	2000 QG_{24}	—	August 25, 2000	Socorro	LINEAR	·	1.4 km	MPC · JPL
45809	2000 QH_{28}	—	August 24, 2000	Socorro	LINEAR	·	1.8 km	MPC · JPL
45810	2000 QP_{32}	—	August 26, 2000	Socorro	LINEAR	fast?	2.3 km	MPC · JPL
45811	2000 QN_{38}	—	August 24, 2000	Socorro	LINEAR	·	2.4 km	MPC · JPL
45812	2000 QV_{39}	—	August 24, 2000	Socorro	LINEAR	·	2.3 km	MPC · JPL
45813	2000 QA_{45}	—	August 24, 2000	Socorro	LINEAR	fast	2.1 km	MPC · JPL
45814	2000 QJ_{61}	—	August 28, 2000	Socorro	LINEAR	·	1.9 km	MPC · JPL
45815	2000 QF_{67}	—	August 28, 2000	Socorro	LINEAR	V	2.0 km	MPC · JPL
45816	2000 QO_{72}	—	August 24, 2000	Socorro	LINEAR	·	3.3 km	MPC · JPL
45817	2000 QM_{78}	—	August 24, 2000	Socorro	LINEAR	·	2.2 km	MPC · JPL
45818	2000 QG_{79}	—	August 24, 2000	Socorro	LINEAR	·	2.1 km	MPC · JPL
45819	2000 QL_{101}	—	August 28, 2000	Socorro	LINEAR	·	2.3 km	MPC · JPL
45820	2000 QQ_{102}	—	August 28, 2000	Socorro	LINEAR	·	2.9 km	MPC · JPL
45821	2000 QS_{114}	—	August 24, 2000	Socorro	LINEAR	·	1.8 km	MPC · JPL
45822	2000 QQ_{116}	—	August 28, 2000	Socorro	LINEAR	L5	19 km	MPC · JPL
45823	2000 QC_{120}	—	August 25, 2000	Socorro	LINEAR	V	1.9 km	MPC · JPL
45824	2000 QB_{122}	—	August 25, 2000	Socorro	LINEAR	·	1.8 km	MPC · JPL
45825	2000 QW_{123}	—	August 25, 2000	Socorro	LINEAR	H	1.7 km	MPC · JPL
45826	2000 QX_{128}	—	August 25, 2000	Socorro	LINEAR	·	2.2 km	MPC · JPL
45827	2000 QV_{149}	—	August 25, 2000	Socorro	LINEAR	·	3.2 km	MPC · JPL
45828	2000 QK_{157}	—	August 31, 2000	Socorro	LINEAR	V	2.3 km	MPC · JPL
45829	2000 QR_{166}	—	August 31, 2000	Socorro	LINEAR	·	3.6 km	MPC · JPL
45830	2000 QW_{181}	—	August 31, 2000	Socorro	LINEAR	·	3.1 km	MPC · JPL
45831	2000 QW_{184}	—	August 26, 2000	Socorro	LINEAR	·	3.9 km	MPC · JPL
45832	2000 QK_{186}	—	August 26, 2000	Socorro	LINEAR	(2076)	2.7 km	MPC · JPL
45833	2000 QX_{188}	—	August 26, 2000	Socorro	LINEAR	·	2.0 km	MPC · JPL
45834	2000 QU_{229}	—	August 31, 2000	Socorro	LINEAR	·	1.7 km	MPC · JPL
45835	2000 RZ	—	September 1, 2000	Socorro	LINEAR	·	2.5 km	MPC · JPL
45836	2000 RT_{21}	—	September 1, 2000	Socorro	LINEAR	·	1.8 km	MPC · JPL
45837	2000 RD_{27}	—	September 1, 2000	Socorro	LINEAR	PHO	3.6 km	MPC · JPL
45838	2000 RV_{30}	—	September 1, 2000	Socorro	LINEAR	V	2.4 km	MPC · JPL
45839	2000 RQ_{37}	—	September 3, 2000	Socorro	LINEAR	H	1.6 km	MPC · JPL
45840	2000 RU_{44}	—	September 3, 2000	Socorro	LINEAR	·	5.4 km	MPC · JPL
45841	2000 RX_{55}	—	September 5, 2000	Socorro	LINEAR	NYS ·	4.7 km	MPC · JPL
45842	2000 RC_{66}	—	September 1, 2000	Socorro	LINEAR	·	2.2 km	MPC · JPL
45843	2000 RL_{73}	—	September 2, 2000	Socorro	LINEAR	·	1.7 km	MPC · JPL
45844	2000 RN_{74}	—	September 3, 2000	Socorro	LINEAR	·	4.8 km	MPC · JPL
45845	2000 RM_{75}	—	September 3, 2000	Socorro	LINEAR	V	1.8 km	MPC · JPL
45846 Avdellidou	2000 RA_{96}	Avdellidou	September 4, 2000	Anderson Mesa	LONEOS	NYS ·	5.2 km	MPC · JPL
45847 Gartrelle	2000 RC_{96}	Gartrelle	September 4, 2000	Anderson Mesa	LONEOS	NYS ·	4.5 km	MPC · JPL
45848	2000 SY_{11}	—	September 20, 2000	Socorro	LINEAR	·	2.2 km	MPC · JPL
45849	2000 SG_{98}	—	September 23, 2000	Socorro	LINEAR	·	3.1 km	MPC · JPL
45850	2000 SH_{209}	—	September 25, 2000	Socorro	LINEAR	HIL · 3:2	15 km	MPC · JPL
45851	2000 SH_{239}	—	September 27, 2000	Socorro	LINEAR	·	3.4 km	MPC · JPL
45852	2000 SG_{259}	—	September 24, 2000	Socorro	LINEAR	·	2.8 km	MPC · JPL
45853	2000 SN_{263}	—	September 26, 2000	Socorro	LINEAR	·	1.7 km	MPC · JPL
45854	2000 SR_{285}	—	September 23, 2000	Socorro	LINEAR	·	1.8 km	MPC · JPL
45855 Susumuyoshitomi	2000 TA_{2}	Susumuyoshitomi	October 3, 2000	Bisei SG Center	BATTeRS	NYS	3.1 km	MPC · JPL
45856	2000 TO_{38}	—	October 1, 2000	Socorro	LINEAR	·	9.3 km	MPC · JPL
45857	2000 TH_{61}	—	October 2, 2000	Anderson Mesa	LONEOS	EUN	6.2 km	MPC · JPL
45858	2000 UP_{7}	—	October 24, 2000	Socorro	LINEAR	NYS ·	6.8 km	MPC · JPL
45859	2000 UG_{13}	—	October 25, 2000	Socorro	LINEAR	·	2.5 km	MPC · JPL
45860	2000 UG_{27}	—	October 24, 2000	Socorro	LINEAR	·	3.4 km	MPC · JPL
45861	2000 UZ_{37}	—	October 24, 2000	Socorro	LINEAR	·	7.5 km	MPC · JPL
45862	2000 UQ_{51}	—	October 24, 2000	Socorro	LINEAR	3:2	8.6 km	MPC · JPL
45863	2000 UQ_{81}	—	October 24, 2000	Socorro	LINEAR	·	2.8 km	MPC · JPL
45864	2000 UO_{97}	—	October 25, 2000	Socorro	LINEAR	·	4.3 km	MPC · JPL
45865	2000 UT_{97}	—	October 25, 2000	Socorro	LINEAR	V	3.0 km	MPC · JPL
45866	2000 UX_{109}	—	October 31, 2000	Socorro	LINEAR	TEL	4.4 km	MPC · JPL
45867	2000 VS_{17}	—	November 1, 2000	Socorro	LINEAR	·	2.2 km	MPC · JPL
45868	2000 VB_{20}	—	November 1, 2000	Socorro	LINEAR	THM ·	5.7 km	MPC · JPL
45869	2000 VG_{34}	—	November 1, 2000	Socorro	LINEAR	·	2.2 km	MPC · JPL
45870	2000 VW_{37}	—	November 1, 2000	Socorro	LINEAR	·	2.7 km	MPC · JPL
45871	2000 VD_{38}	—	November 1, 2000	Socorro	LINEAR	EUN	3.8 km	MPC · JPL
45872	2000 VR_{49}	—	November 2, 2000	Socorro	LINEAR	·	2.0 km	MPC · JPL
45873	2000 VK_{61}	—	November 9, 2000	Socorro	LINEAR	·	1.9 km	MPC · JPL
45874	2000 WM_{3}	—	November 17, 2000	Socorro	LINEAR	H	1.4 km	MPC · JPL
45875	2000 WJ_{19}	—	November 25, 2000	Fountain Hills	C. W. Juels	·	14 km	MPC · JPL
45876	2000 WD_{27}	—	November 26, 2000	Desert Beaver	W. K. Y. Yeung	·	3.1 km	MPC · JPL
45877	2000 WR_{29}	—	November 21, 2000	Socorro	LINEAR	BAR	4.3 km	MPC · JPL
45878 Sadaoaoki	2000 WX_{29}	Sadaoaoki	November 23, 2000	Bisei SG Center	BATTeRS	H	2.0 km	MPC · JPL
45879	2000 WR_{33}	—	November 20, 2000	Socorro	LINEAR	·	1.7 km	MPC · JPL
45880	2000 WG_{49}	—	November 21, 2000	Socorro	LINEAR	H	1.5 km	MPC · JPL
45881	2000 WD_{55}	—	November 20, 2000	Socorro	LINEAR	·	4.4 km	MPC · JPL
45882	2000 WX_{61}	—	November 21, 2000	Socorro	LINEAR	·	4.8 km	MPC · JPL
45883	2000 WL_{87}	—	November 20, 2000	Socorro	LINEAR	·	3.0 km	MPC · JPL
45884	2000 WB_{93}	—	November 21, 2000	Socorro	LINEAR	·	2.3 km	MPC · JPL
45885	2000 WX_{95}	—	November 21, 2000	Socorro	LINEAR	·	3.7 km	MPC · JPL
45886	2000 WL_{115}	—	November 20, 2000	Socorro	LINEAR	·	2.8 km	MPC · JPL
45887	2000 WS_{117}	—	November 20, 2000	Socorro	LINEAR	·	2.2 km	MPC · JPL
45888	2000 WL_{130}	—	November 20, 2000	Kitt Peak	Spacewatch	·	2.5 km	MPC · JPL
45889	2000 WU_{130}	—	November 20, 2000	Anderson Mesa	LONEOS	KOR	3.8 km	MPC · JPL
45890	2000 WS_{169}	—	November 26, 2000	Desert Beaver	W. K. Y. Yeung	·	2.2 km	MPC · JPL
45891	2000 WG_{178}	—	November 28, 2000	Kitt Peak	Spacewatch	V	1.8 km	MPC · JPL
45892	2000 WR_{179}	—	November 26, 2000	Socorro	LINEAR	PHO	8.0 km	MPC · JPL
45893	2000 XL_{7}	—	December 1, 2000	Socorro	LINEAR	·	3.4 km	MPC · JPL
45894	2000 XW_{15}	—	December 1, 2000	Socorro	LINEAR	EUN	3.6 km	MPC · JPL
45895	2000 XV_{25}	—	December 4, 2000	Socorro	LINEAR	·	2.1 km	MPC · JPL
45896	2000 XT_{27}	—	December 4, 2000	Socorro	LINEAR	·	3.0 km	MPC · JPL
45897	2000 XB_{28}	—	December 4, 2000	Socorro	LINEAR	V	1.8 km	MPC · JPL
45898	2000 XQ_{49}	—	December 4, 2000	Socorro	LINEAR	H	2.6 km	MPC · JPL
45899	2000 XS_{49}	—	December 4, 2000	Socorro	LINEAR	PHO	2.9 km	MPC · JPL
45900	2000 YG_{10}	—	December 20, 2000	Socorro	LINEAR	H	2.2 km	MPC · JPL

== 45901–46000 ==
back to top

Designation			Discovery			Properties		Ref
Permanent	Provisional	Named after	Date	Site	Discoverer(s)	Category	Diam.	Ref
45901	2000 YH_{16}	—	December 23, 2000	Desert Beaver	W. K. Y. Yeung	(194)	7.2 km	MPC · JPL
45902	2000 YJ_{18}	—	December 20, 2000	Socorro	LINEAR	(5)	2.7 km	MPC · JPL
45903	2000 YL_{18}	—	December 20, 2000	Socorro	LINEAR	·	5.2 km	MPC · JPL
45904	2000 YV_{29}	—	December 27, 2000	Oizumi	T. Kobayashi	EUN	4.2 km	MPC · JPL
45905	2000 YF_{34}	—	December 28, 2000	Socorro	LINEAR	·	2.1 km	MPC · JPL
45906	2000 YW_{34}	—	December 28, 2000	Socorro	LINEAR	·	11 km	MPC · JPL
45907	2000 YC_{35}	—	December 28, 2000	Socorro	LINEAR	·	2.7 km	MPC · JPL
45908	2000 YE_{51}	—	December 30, 2000	Socorro	LINEAR	·	3.0 km	MPC · JPL
45909	2000 YE_{53}	—	December 30, 2000	Socorro	LINEAR	·	2.2 km	MPC · JPL
45910	2000 YN_{57}	—	December 30, 2000	Socorro	LINEAR	·	5.1 km	MPC · JPL
45911	2000 YX_{63}	—	December 30, 2000	Socorro	LINEAR	·	2.1 km	MPC · JPL
45912	2000 YZ_{64}	—	December 30, 2000	Kitt Peak	Spacewatch	·	1.7 km	MPC · JPL
45913	2000 YV_{67}	—	December 28, 2000	Socorro	LINEAR	·	3.4 km	MPC · JPL
45914	2000 YE_{68}	—	December 28, 2000	Socorro	LINEAR	·	2.9 km	MPC · JPL
45915	2000 YN_{68}	—	December 28, 2000	Socorro	LINEAR	·	2.4 km	MPC · JPL
45916	2000 YU_{68}	—	December 28, 2000	Socorro	LINEAR	·	1.9 km	MPC · JPL
45917	2000 YE_{91}	—	December 30, 2000	Socorro	LINEAR	(2076)	1.8 km	MPC · JPL
45918	2000 YT_{96}	—	December 30, 2000	Socorro	LINEAR	NYS	2.8 km	MPC · JPL
45919	2000 YZ_{103}	—	December 28, 2000	Socorro	LINEAR	·	3.1 km	MPC · JPL
45920	2000 YP_{104}	—	December 28, 2000	Socorro	LINEAR	ADE	11 km	MPC · JPL
45921	2000 YU_{104}	—	December 28, 2000	Socorro	LINEAR	GEF	5.0 km	MPC · JPL
45922	2000 YN_{105}	—	December 28, 2000	Socorro	LINEAR	·	2.4 km	MPC · JPL
45923	2000 YV_{107}	—	December 30, 2000	Socorro	LINEAR	·	3.6 km	MPC · JPL
45924	2000 YZ_{108}	—	December 30, 2000	Socorro	LINEAR	·	2.6 km	MPC · JPL
45925	2000 YK_{111}	—	December 30, 2000	Socorro	LINEAR	NYS	2.8 km	MPC · JPL
45926	2000 YT_{112}	—	December 30, 2000	Socorro	LINEAR	·	2.1 km	MPC · JPL
45927	2000 YR_{113}	—	December 30, 2000	Socorro	LINEAR	·	2.7 km	MPC · JPL
45928	2000 YB_{116}	—	December 30, 2000	Socorro	LINEAR	·	3.7 km	MPC · JPL
45929	2000 YP_{116}	—	December 30, 2000	Socorro	LINEAR	·	2.8 km	MPC · JPL
45930	2000 YQ_{117}	—	December 30, 2000	Socorro	LINEAR	·	2.5 km	MPC · JPL
45931	2000 YF_{121}	—	December 21, 2000	Socorro	LINEAR	·	2.5 km	MPC · JPL
45932	2000 YT_{121}	—	December 22, 2000	Haleakala	NEAT	EUN ·	10 km	MPC · JPL
45933	2000 YU_{128}	—	December 29, 2000	Haleakala	NEAT	·	2.0 km	MPC · JPL
45934	2000 YK_{129}	—	December 29, 2000	Kitt Peak	Spacewatch	·	2.4 km	MPC · JPL
45935	2000 YU_{132}	—	December 30, 2000	Anderson Mesa	LONEOS	EUN	4.2 km	MPC · JPL
45936	2000 YB_{133}	—	December 30, 2000	Anderson Mesa	LONEOS	EOS	7.9 km	MPC · JPL
45937	2000 YD_{133}	—	December 30, 2000	Anderson Mesa	LONEOS	·	8.5 km	MPC · JPL
45938	2001 AV_{4}	—	January 2, 2001	Socorro	LINEAR	V	2.1 km	MPC · JPL
45939	2001 AE_{7}	—	January 2, 2001	Socorro	LINEAR	V	1.5 km	MPC · JPL
45940	2001 AZ_{10}	—	January 2, 2001	Socorro	LINEAR	·	2.3 km	MPC · JPL
45941	2001 AM_{13}	—	January 2, 2001	Socorro	LINEAR	·	2.8 km	MPC · JPL
45942	2001 AX_{13}	—	January 2, 2001	Socorro	LINEAR	·	2.3 km	MPC · JPL
45943	2001 AU_{16}	—	January 2, 2001	Socorro	LINEAR	·	2.1 km	MPC · JPL
45944	2001 AW_{16}	—	January 2, 2001	Socorro	LINEAR	·	6.5 km	MPC · JPL
45945	2001 AM_{17}	—	January 2, 2001	Socorro	LINEAR	·	3.1 km	MPC · JPL
45946	2001 AU_{17}	—	January 2, 2001	Socorro	LINEAR	·	3.7 km	MPC · JPL
45947	2001 AY_{17}	—	January 2, 2001	Socorro	LINEAR	·	2.0 km	MPC · JPL
45948	2001 AP_{18}	—	January 2, 2001	Socorro	LINEAR	·	2.9 km	MPC · JPL
45949	2001 AS_{23}	—	January 3, 2001	Socorro	LINEAR	MAR	3.5 km	MPC · JPL
45950	2001 AL_{25}	—	January 4, 2001	Socorro	LINEAR	H	1.5 km	MPC · JPL
45951	2001 AE_{29}	—	January 4, 2001	Socorro	LINEAR	·	2.7 km	MPC · JPL
45952	2001 AS_{31}	—	January 4, 2001	Socorro	LINEAR	V	2.6 km	MPC · JPL
45953	2001 AZ_{33}	—	January 4, 2001	Socorro	LINEAR	·	3.4 km	MPC · JPL
45954	2001 AP_{38}	—	January 3, 2001	Anderson Mesa	LONEOS	PHO	2.6 km	MPC · JPL
45955	2001 AK_{40}	—	January 3, 2001	Anderson Mesa	LONEOS	·	2.3 km	MPC · JPL
45956	2001 AG_{41}	—	January 3, 2001	Socorro	LINEAR	·	4.3 km	MPC · JPL
45957	2001 AQ_{44}	—	January 15, 2001	Oizumi	T. Kobayashi	NYS	3.3 km	MPC · JPL
45958	2001 AF_{45}	—	January 15, 2001	Oizumi	T. Kobayashi	PHO	2.7 km	MPC · JPL
45959	2001 AA_{51}	—	January 15, 2001	Kitt Peak	Spacewatch	·	1.8 km	MPC · JPL
45960	2001 BX	—	January 17, 2001	Oizumi	T. Kobayashi	H	1.7 km	MPC · JPL
45961	2001 BA_{6}	—	January 18, 2001	Socorro	LINEAR	·	2.7 km	MPC · JPL
45962	2001 BM_{11}	—	January 20, 2001	Haleakala	NEAT	H	1.4 km	MPC · JPL
45963	2001 BX_{14}	—	January 21, 2001	Oizumi	T. Kobayashi	·	2.4 km	MPC · JPL
45964	2001 BE_{15}	—	January 21, 2001	Oizumi	T. Kobayashi	·	2.2 km	MPC · JPL
45965	2001 BP_{20}	—	January 19, 2001	Socorro	LINEAR	V	1.9 km	MPC · JPL
45966	2001 BS_{23}	—	January 20, 2001	Socorro	LINEAR	·	2.0 km	MPC · JPL
45967	2001 BF_{24}	—	January 20, 2001	Socorro	LINEAR	·	1.6 km	MPC · JPL
45968	2001 BG_{25}	—	January 20, 2001	Socorro	LINEAR	·	5.9 km	MPC · JPL
45969	2001 BC_{26}	—	January 20, 2001	Socorro	LINEAR	·	1.9 km	MPC · JPL
45970	2001 BZ_{27}	—	January 20, 2001	Socorro	LINEAR	·	1.2 km	MPC · JPL
45971	2001 BF_{29}	—	January 20, 2001	Socorro	LINEAR	·	1.7 km	MPC · JPL
45972	2001 BU_{30}	—	January 20, 2001	Socorro	LINEAR	·	2.2 km	MPC · JPL
45973	2001 BP_{33}	—	January 20, 2001	Socorro	LINEAR	·	3.4 km	MPC · JPL
45974	2001 BG_{35}	—	January 20, 2001	Socorro	LINEAR	·	2.0 km	MPC · JPL
45975	2001 BV_{40}	—	January 21, 2001	Socorro	LINEAR	HNS	4.1 km	MPC · JPL
45976	2001 BT_{41}	—	January 25, 2001	Kitt Peak	Spacewatch	·	5.0 km	MPC · JPL
45977	2001 BU_{44}	—	January 19, 2001	Socorro	LINEAR	·	5.8 km	MPC · JPL
45978	2001 BY_{44}	—	January 19, 2001	Socorro	LINEAR	·	4.1 km	MPC · JPL
45979	2001 BZ_{46}	—	January 21, 2001	Socorro	LINEAR	·	2.6 km	MPC · JPL
45980	2001 BT_{48}	—	January 21, 2001	Socorro	LINEAR	EUN	3.0 km	MPC · JPL
45981	2001 BW_{50}	—	January 28, 2001	Oizumi	T. Kobayashi	EUN	3.1 km	MPC · JPL
45982	2001 BE_{51}	—	January 27, 2001	Haleakala	NEAT	EUN	2.6 km	MPC · JPL
45983	2001 BF_{54}	—	January 18, 2001	Kitt Peak	Spacewatch	·	3.6 km	MPC · JPL
45984	2001 BK_{56}	—	January 19, 2001	Socorro	LINEAR	·	2.9 km	MPC · JPL
45985	2001 BW_{59}	—	January 26, 2001	Socorro	LINEAR	·	4.2 km	MPC · JPL
45986	2001 BC_{66}	—	January 26, 2001	Socorro	LINEAR	V	2.0 km	MPC · JPL
45987	2001 BF_{66}	—	January 26, 2001	Socorro	LINEAR	EOS	6.5 km	MPC · JPL
45988	2001 BK_{66}	—	January 26, 2001	Socorro	LINEAR	·	3.4 km	MPC · JPL
45989	2001 BA_{67}	—	January 30, 2001	Socorro	LINEAR	·	8.9 km	MPC · JPL
45990	2001 BT_{69}	—	January 31, 2001	Socorro	LINEAR	·	3.0 km	MPC · JPL
45991	2001 BQ_{70}	—	January 26, 2001	Socorro	LINEAR	PHO	6.1 km	MPC · JPL
45992	2001 BX_{70}	—	January 29, 2001	Socorro	LINEAR	·	1.5 km	MPC · JPL
45993	2001 BE_{71}	—	January 29, 2001	Socorro	LINEAR	·	1.8 km	MPC · JPL
45994	2001 BQ_{71}	—	January 29, 2001	Socorro	LINEAR	·	2.5 km	MPC · JPL
45995	2001 BB_{72}	—	January 31, 2001	Socorro	LINEAR	·	4.4 km	MPC · JPL
45996	2001 BY_{72}	—	January 27, 2001	Haleakala	NEAT	·	3.7 km	MPC · JPL
45997	2001 BO_{73}	—	January 29, 2001	Socorro	LINEAR	·	1.7 km	MPC · JPL
45998	2001 BZ_{75}	—	January 26, 2001	Socorro	LINEAR	·	3.0 km	MPC · JPL
45999	2001 BE_{77}	—	January 26, 2001	Socorro	LINEAR	·	1.8 km	MPC · JPL
46000	2001 BO_{79}	—	January 21, 2001	Socorro	LINEAR	V	1.7 km	MPC · JPL

back to top

== See also ==
- Meanings of minor-planet names: 45001–46000
