= Meanings of minor-planet names: 45001–46000 =

As minor planet discoveries are confirmed, they are given a permanent number by the IAU's Minor Planet Center (MPC), and the discoverers can then submit names for them, following the IAU's naming conventions. The list below concerns those minor planets in the specified number-range that have received names, and explains the meanings of those names.

Official naming citations of newly named small Solar System bodies are approved and published in a bulletin by IAU's Working Group for Small Bodies Nomenclature (WGSBN). Before May 2021, citations were published in MPC's Minor Planet Circulars for many decades. Recent citations can also be found on the JPL Small-Body Database (SBDB). Until his death in 2016, German astronomer Lutz D. Schmadel compiled these citations into the Dictionary of Minor Planet Names (DMP) and regularly updated the collection.

Based on Paul Herget's The Names of the Minor Planets, Schmadel also researched the unclear origin of numerous asteroids, most of which had been named prior to World War II. This article incorporates text from this source, which is in the public domain: SBDB New namings may only be added to this list below after official publication as the preannouncement of names is condemned. The WGSBN publishes a comprehensive guideline for the naming rules of non-cometary small Solar System bodies.

== 45001–45100 ==
Named minor planet	Provisional	This minor planet was named for...	Ref · Catalog
45027 Cosquer	1999 WA_{9}	Henri Cosquer (born 1950), a professional French diver who discovered Cosquer Cave near Marseille, France in 1985. The cave's entrance is below the Mediterranean sea level and contains numerous cave painting, some of them over 27,000 years old. The asteroid's name was proposed by G. Burki.	JPL · 45027
45073 Doyanrose	1999 XN_{37}	Doyan Rose Ruthroff (1923–1974), mother of American astronomer John Ruthroff, who discovered this minor planet.	JPL · 45073

== 45101–45200 ==
back to top

Named minor planet	Provisional	This minor planet was named for...	Ref · Catalog
There are no named minor planets in this number range

== 45201–45300 ==
back to top

Named minor planet	Provisional	This minor planet was named for...	Ref · Catalog
45261 Decoen	2000 AB_{2}	Yvette Decoen (born 1951), a Swiss physics teacher and friend of Swiss amateur astronomer Stefano Sposetti who discovered this minor planet.	MPC · 45261
45298 Williamon	2000 AE_{42}	Richard Williamon (born 1946), American astronomer, researcher of eclipsing stars and member of the IAU. He serves as director of the Fernbank Science Center with its observatory and planetarium in Atlanta (IAU).	JPL · 45298
45299 Stivell	2000 AL_{43}	Alan Stivell (born 1944), a French and Breton musician and a master of the Celtic harp.	JPL · 45299
45300 Thewrewk	2000 AF_{45}	Aurél Ponori Thewrewk (1921–2014), Hungarian astronomical historian, director of the Urania Public Observatory and the Budapest Planetarium, honorary president of the Hungarian Astronomical Association^{(hu)}	JPL · 45300

== 45301–45400 ==
back to top

Named minor planet	Provisional	This minor planet was named for...	Ref · Catalog
45305 Paulscherrer	2000 AH_{48}	Paul Scherrer, Swiss physicist and mathematician	JPL · 45305
45338 Ericevans	2000 AT_{85}	Eric D. Evans (b. 1961), an American engineer, provided technical leadership, expertise, and strategic direction for 18 years as Director of MIT Lincoln Laboratory.	IAU · 45338

== 45401–45500 ==
back to top

Named minor planet	Provisional	This minor planet was named for...	Ref · Catalog
45492 Sławomirbreiter	2000 AD_{241}	Sławomir Breiter (born 1963) is a professor at the Poznań Astronomical Observatory in Poland. His work focuses on celestial mechanics, including contributions to the development of analytical and semi-analytical theories of the asteroidal YORP effect and the study of orbital dynamics	IAU · 45492
45500 Motegi	2000 BN_{3}	Hiromitsu Motegi (born 1960), a Japanese amateur astronomer and a promoter and instructor of astronomy, especially to children. Through his web site, he also collaborates with other Japanese amateur astronomers (HP).	JPL · 45500

== 45501–45600 ==
back to top

Named minor planet	Provisional	This minor planet was named for...	Ref · Catalog
45509 Robertward	2000 BZ_{22}	Robert Ward (born 1976) was inspired by his sighting of a fireball from his home in Bullhead City, Arizona in 1989. He has gone on to find nearly 6, 000 meteorites in 600 localities on six continents, including the recovery of over 20 witnessed falls.	JPL · 45509
45510 Kashuba	2000 BB_{23}	John H. Kashuba (born 1947) is a meteorite collector and photographer whose artful high-resolution images of meteorites in thin section appear in books, magazines and online, including his Micro Visions column in Meteorite Times. With Belgian chemist Roger Warin, he authored the Centerpiece column in Meteorite magazine.	JPL · 45510
45511 Anneblack	2000 BC_{23}	Anne Black (born 1944) is one of the founders of the International Meteorite Collector's Association and served three terms as president. She has translated numerous books and articles about meteorites from her native French into English for publication in the U.S.	JPL · 45511
45512 Holcomb	2000 BD_{23}	Amasa Holcomb (1787–1875) was a self taught American astronomer and optician who fabricated surveying instruments and astronomical telescopes of Herschelian configuration up to 254 mm aperture. Two of his instruments are currently at the Smithsonian Institution.	JPL · 45512
45517 Jett	2000 BE_{31}	Jacob (born 1986) and Caitlin Jett (born 1986) are a husband and wife team of amateur astronomers who not only observe together but have fabricated much of their own astronomical equipment. Using this equipment they also conduct educational outreach. Jacob is a professional paleontologist in Colorado.	JPL · 45517
45518 Larrykrozel	2000 BO_{33}	Larry Krozel (1964–2020), a planetarium lecturer at the Treworgy Planetarium in Mystic Seaport, Connecticut. He could explain complex astronomical concepts to visitors of all ages and was an active member of the International Meteorite Collectors Association and the AAVSO Solar Section.	JPL · 45518
45519 Triebold	2000 BS_{33}	Michael Triebold (born 1953), an American paleontologist, preparator of museum fossils, and founder of Triebold Paleontology Incorporated. He was awarded the 2019 Charles H. Sternberg Medal by the Association of Applied Paleontological Sciences for "contributions to paleontology" and for "fostering cooperation and understanding between professional, amateur and academic paleontologists".	IAU · 45519
45580 Renéracine	2000 CB_{81}	René Racine (born 1939), a Canadian astronomer who is an expert in globular clusters, galaxies, astronomical instruments and adaptive optics. He has been a long-time director of the Mont Mégantic Observatory and Canada–France–Hawaii Telescope.	JPL · 45580
45594 Wendyrichard	2000 CJ_{111}	Wendy Richard (1943-2009), English actress best known for playing Miss Shirley Brahms on Are You Being Served? and Pauline Fowler on EastEnders	IAU · 45594
45595 Inman	2000 CK_{111}	John Inman (1935-2007), English actor best known for playing Mr. Humphries on Are You Being Served?	IAU · 45595
45596 Molliesugden	2000 CF_{112}	Mollie Sugden (1922-2009), British actress best known for playing Mrs. Betty Slocombe on Are You Being Served?	IAU · 45596

== 45601–45700 ==
back to top

Named minor planet	Provisional	This minor planet was named for...	Ref · Catalog
45638 Teske	2000 EK_{20}	David Teske, American amateur astronomer.	IAU · 45638
45639 Tomney	2000 EP_{20}	Jim Tomney, American amateur astronomer.	IAU · 45639
45640 Mikepuzio	2000 ED_{21}	Mike Puzio (born 2004) is an Eagle Scout. He suggested the name for Bennu, target of the OSIRIS-REx mission. He has given many presentations about the mission as an OSIRIS-REx Ambassador.	IAU · 45640
45641 Larrypuzio	2000 EK_{21}	Larry Puzio (b. 1965), an OSIRIS-REx Ambassador, busy pediatrician, and life-long fan of space exploration.	IAU · 45641
45685 Torrycoppin	2000 EA_{139}	Torry Coppin (1950–1993) was an amateur astronomer and an electronics engineer for radio stations in the Sarasota, Florida area.	JPL · 45685
45687 Pranverahyseni	2000 EK_{140}	Pranvera Hyseni (born 1995) is the founder and Director of Astronomy Outreach of Kosovo, the largest non-profit astronomy outreach organization in that country. She is an enthusiastic ambassador for Kosovo amateur astronomy.	JPL · 45687
45688 Lawrencestacey	2000 EV_{142}	K. Lawrence Stacey (born 1950) is a long-time amateur astronomer, first as a youth in Southfield, Michigan and later in Asheville, North Carolina. He specializes in the observation of multiple stars.	JPL · 45688
45689 Brianjones	2000 EC_{144}	Brian Jones (born 1953) is a founding member of Bradford Astronomical Society. Known for writing many articles for newspapers, magazines and journals (scientific and general-interest), he has also penned over 18 books which have covered a range of astronomy and space-related topics.	JPL · 45689
45690 Janiradebaugh	2000 EL_{146}	Jani Radebaugh (born 1970) is an American planetary scientist and professor of geology at Brigham Young University. She is a contributing scientist with NASA's Dragonfly mission.	JPL · 45690
45692 Poshyachinda	2000 EJ_{148}	Saran Poshyachinda (born 1964) is executive director of the National Astronomical Research Institute of Thailand. Encouraging public interest in astronomy, he was crucial in the construction of the Thai National Observatory, regional observatories for the public throughout Thailand and a 40-m radio telescope.	JPL · 45692
45699 Maryalba	2000 EO_{199}	Mary Alba (born 1957) is the daughter of Walter and Peggy Haas, founders of the Association of Lunar and Planetary Observers (ALPO). On her own she has been a strong supporter of the organization, encouraging observers and taking her displays of ALPO history to national astronomical meetings.	IAU · 45699
45700 Levi-Setti	2000 EP_{204}	Riccardo Levi-Setti (born 1928), a world-renowned expert on trilobites.	JPL · 45700

== 45701–45800 ==
back to top

Named minor planet	Provisional	This minor planet was named for...	Ref · Catalog
45737 Benita	2000 HB	Benita Segal, American physician and wife of the discoverer	JPL · 45737
45752 Venditti	2000 JY_{70}	Flaviane Venditti (born 1980) is an observatory scientist at the Arecibo Observatory, Puerto Rico, who specializes in radar observations of near-Earth asteroids, impact mitigation techniques, and spacecraft dynamics.	IAU · 45752

== 45801–45900 ==
back to top

Named minor planet	Provisional	This minor planet was named for...	Ref · Catalog
45846 Avdellidou	2000 RA_{96}	Chrysoula Avdellidou (born 1987) has contributed significantly to knowledge of hypervelocity impact physics with experimental, theoretical and lunar flash observations. She showed that collisions can implant projectile material on small body surfaces, clarifying previously unexplained observations.	IAU · 45846
45847 Gartrelle	2000 RC_{96}	Gordon Gartrelle (born 1955) received his Ph.D. from the University of North Dakota. His primary studies are of D-type asteroids, their potential parent bodies, and their mineralogy.	IAU · 45847
45855 Susumuyoshitomi	2000 TA_{2}	Susumu Yoshitomi (born 1948) is one of the directors of the Japan Space Forum. He contributed greatly to the construction of Bisei Spaceguard Center.	IAU · 45855
45878 Sadaoaoki	2000 WX_{29}	Sadao Aoki (born 1962) is one of the staff of the Japan Space Forum. For many years, he has contributed greatly to the operation and facility maintenance of the Bisei Spaceguard Center.	IAU · 45878

== 45901–46000 ==
back to top

Named minor planet	Provisional	This minor planet was named for...	Ref · Catalog
There are no named minor planets in this number range

back to top

Preceded by 44,001–45,000	Meanings of minor-planet names List of minor planets: 45,001–46,000	Succeeded by 46,001–47,000
