= 45300 Thewrewk =

Main-belt asteroid

- Thewrewk imaged by Krisztián Sárneczky in January 2000

Discovery
- Discovered by: K. Sárneczky; L. Kiss
- Discovery site: Piszkéstető Stn.
- Discovery date: 1 January 2000

Designations
- Pronunciation: Hungarian pronunciation: [ˈtørøk]
- Named after: Aurél Ponori Thewrewk (Hungarian astronomer)
- Alternative designations: 2000 AF_{45} · 1998 XX_{37}
- Minor planet category: main-belt · (outer) background · Eos

Orbital characteristics
- Epoch 4 September 2017 (JD 2458000.5)
- Uncertainty parameter 0
- Observation arc: 18.48 yr (6,748 days)
- Aphelion: 3.3504 AU
- Perihelion: 2.8562 AU
- Semi-major axis: 3.1033 AU
- Eccentricity: 0.0796
- Orbital period (sidereal): 5.47 yr (1,997 days)
- Mean anomaly: 262.37°
- Mean motion: 0° 10^{m} 49.08^{s} / day
- Inclination: 10.238°
- Longitude of ascending node: 263.41°
- Argument of perihelion: 63.556°

Physical characteristics
- Dimensions: 13.230±0.164 km
- Geometric albedo: 0.077±0.009
- Absolute magnitude (H): 13.1

45300 Thewrewk (provisional designation 2000 AF_{45}) is a dark background asteroid from the outer regions of the asteroid belt, approximately 13 kilometers in diameter. It was discovered on 1 January 2000, by astronomers Krisztián Sárneczky and László Kiss at the Piszkéstető Station of the Konkoly Observatory in Hungary. The asteroid was named after Hungarian astronomer Aurél Ponori Thewrewk.

== Orbit and classification ==
When applying the hierarchical clustering method to this asteroid's proper orbital elements, Thewrewk is both a non-family asteroid from the main belt's background population (according to Nesvorný) and a core member of the Eos family (according to Milani and Knežević). It orbits the Sun in the outer asteroid belt at a distance of 2.9–3.4 AU once every 5 years and 6 months (1,997 days; semi-major axis of 3.10 AU). Its orbit has an eccentricity of 0.08 and an inclination of 10° with respect to the ecliptic. The body's observation arc begins in December 1998, with its first observations as 1998 XX_{37} at Lincoln Laboratory's Experimental Test Site, New Mexico.

== Physical characteristics ==
=== Diameter and albedo ===
According to the survey carried out by the NEOWISE mission of NASA's Wide-field Infrared Survey Explorer, Thewrewk measures 13.230 kilometers in diameter and its surface has an albedo of 0.077.

=== Rotation period ===
As of 2017, no rotational lightcurve of Thewrewk has been obtained from photometric observations. The body's rotation period, shape and poles remain unknown.

== Naming ==
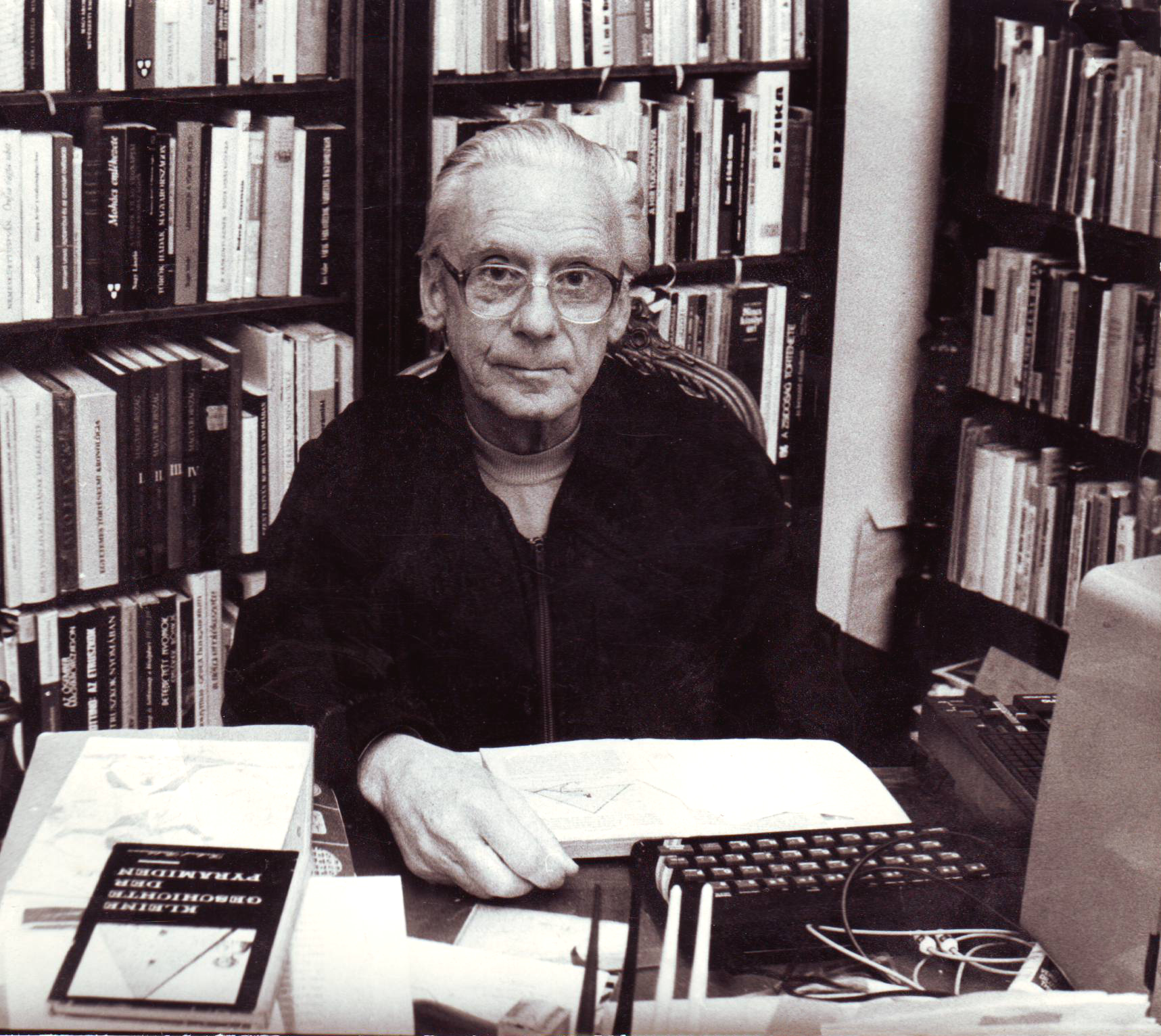
Aurél Ponori Thewrewk

This minor planet was named after Hungarian astronomer Aurél Ponori Thewrewk (1921–2014), who was an expert on the history of astronomy, director of Urania Public Observatory and the Budapest Planetarium, as well honorary president of the Hungarian Astronomical Association (HAA).

The official naming citation was published by the Minor Planet Center on 25 January 2005 (M.P.C. 53471).
