= 45737 Benita =

Main-belt asteroid

Discovery
- Discovered by: B. A. Segal
- Discovery site: Jupiter Obs.
- Discovery date: 22 April 2000

Designations
- Named after: Benita Segal (discoverer's wife)
- Alternative designations: 2000 HB
- Minor planet category: main-belt · (outer) background

Orbital characteristics
- Epoch 4 September 2017 (JD 2458000.5)
- Uncertainty parameter 0
- Observation arc: 19.41 yr (7,091 days)
- Aphelion: 3.3441 AU
- Perihelion: 3.0485 AU
- Semi-major axis: 3.1963 AU
- Eccentricity: 0.0462
- Orbital period (sidereal): 5.71 yr (2,087 days)
- Mean anomaly: 245.14°
- Mean motion: 0° 10^{m} 21^{s} / day
- Inclination: 10.197°
- Longitude of ascending node: 181.43°
- Argument of perihelion: 124.47°

Physical characteristics
- Dimensions: 5.121±1.701 km
- Geometric albedo: 0.294±0.080
- Absolute magnitude (H): 13.6

45737 Benita (provisional designation 2000 HB) is a bright asteroid located in the outer regions of the asteroid belt. It has an estimated diameter of approximately 5 kilometers. The asteroid was discovered on April 22, 2000, by Bruce Segal, an American amateur astronomer, at the Florida Atlantic University's Jupiter Observatory (837) in Boca Raton, Florida.

== Orbit and classification ==
Benita is a non-family asteroid that belongs to the background population of the main belt. It orbits the Sun in the outer region of the asteroid belt, at a distance of 3.0–3.3 AU. It completes one orbit around the Sun every 5 years and 9 months (2,087 days) with a semi-major axis of approximately 3.20 AU. The orbit of Benita is slightly eccentric, with an eccentricity of 0.05, and it is inclined at an angle of 10° with respect to the ecliptic plane. The body's observation arc begins with a precovery taken at Lincoln Laboratory's ETS, New Mexico, on 30 October 1997.

== Physical characteristics ==
=== Diameter and albedo ===
According to the survey carried out by the NEOWISE mission of NASA's Wide-field Infrared Survey Explorer, Benita measures 5.121 kilometers in diameter and its surface has an albedo of 0.294.

=== Rotation period ===
As of 2017, no rotational lightcurve of Benita has been obtained from photometric observations. The body's rotation period, poles and shape remain unknown.

== Naming ==
The discoverer named this minor planet after his wife, Benita Segal (born 1964), a major supporter of the observatory. The official naming citation was published by the Minor Planet Center on 20 November 2002 (M.P.C. 47170).
