= List of minor planets: 40001–41000 =

The following is a partial list of minor planets, running from minor-planet number 40001 through 41000, inclusive. The primary data for this and other partial lists is based on JPL's "Small-Body Orbital Elements" and data available from the Minor Planet Center. Critical list information is also provided by the MPC, unless otherwise specified from Lowell Observatory. A detailed description of the table's columns and additional sources are given on the main page including a complete list of every page in this series, and a statistical break-up on the dynamical classification of minor planets.

Also see the summary list of all named bodies in numerical and alphabetical order, and the corresponding naming citations for the number range of this particular list. New namings may only be added to this list after official publication, as the preannouncement of names is condemned by the Working Group for Small Bodies Nomenclature of the International Astronomical Union.

Near-Earth obj.	MBA (inner)	MBA (outer)	Centaur
Mars-crosser	MBA (middle)	Jupiter trojan	Trans-Neptunian obj.
Unclassified

== 40001–40100 ==
Designation			Discovery			Properties		Ref
Permanent	Provisional	Named after	Date	Site	Discoverer(s)	Category	Diam.	Ref
40001	1998 HB_{88}	—	April 21, 1998	Socorro	LINEAR	·	2.3 km	MPC · JPL
40002	1998 HS_{89}	—	April 21, 1998	Socorro	LINEAR	·	4.1 km	MPC · JPL
40003	1998 HW_{92}	—	April 21, 1998	Socorro	LINEAR	THM	5.4 km	MPC · JPL
40004	1998 HF_{94}	—	April 21, 1998	Socorro	LINEAR	·	4.0 km	MPC · JPL
40005	1998 HA_{96}	—	April 21, 1998	Socorro	LINEAR	MAR	2.7 km	MPC · JPL
40006	1998 HV_{101}	—	April 24, 1998	Reedy Creek	J. Broughton	·	3.8 km	MPC · JPL
40007 Vieuxtemps	1998 HV_{102}	Vieuxtemps	April 25, 1998	La Silla	E. W. Elst	·	6.0 km	MPC · JPL
40008	1998 HN_{111}	—	April 23, 1998	Socorro	LINEAR	·	3.8 km	MPC · JPL
40009	1998 HG_{119}	—	April 23, 1998	Socorro	LINEAR	·	3.7 km	MPC · JPL
40010	1998 HF_{122}	—	April 23, 1998	Socorro	LINEAR	·	12 km	MPC · JPL
40011	1998 HK_{123}	—	April 23, 1998	Socorro	LINEAR	·	5.3 km	MPC · JPL
40012	1998 HP_{123}	—	April 23, 1998	Socorro	LINEAR	·	2.7 km	MPC · JPL
40013	1998 HB_{124}	—	April 23, 1998	Socorro	LINEAR	·	3.5 km	MPC · JPL
40014	1998 HL_{124}	—	April 23, 1998	Socorro	LINEAR	·	3.5 km	MPC · JPL
40015	1998 HB_{125}	—	April 23, 1998	Socorro	LINEAR	MAR	2.7 km	MPC · JPL
40016	1998 HT_{127}	—	April 18, 1998	Socorro	LINEAR	NYS	2.6 km	MPC · JPL
40017	1998 HY_{127}	—	April 18, 1998	Socorro	LINEAR	·	3.5 km	MPC · JPL
40018	1998 HH_{134}	—	April 19, 1998	Socorro	LINEAR	·	2.7 km	MPC · JPL
40019	1998 HR_{136}	—	April 20, 1998	Socorro	LINEAR	·	3.0 km	MPC · JPL
40020	1998 HX_{136}	—	April 20, 1998	Socorro	LINEAR	·	2.8 km	MPC · JPL
40021	1998 HG_{137}	—	April 20, 1998	Socorro	LINEAR	V	1.9 km	MPC · JPL
40022	1998 HP_{146}	—	April 23, 1998	Socorro	LINEAR	·	4.4 km	MPC · JPL
40023 ANPCEN	1998 HU_{148}	ANPCEN	April 25, 1998	La Silla	E. W. Elst	·	3.0 km	MPC · JPL
40024	1998 HW_{148}	—	April 25, 1998	La Silla	E. W. Elst	·	4.3 km	MPC · JPL
40025	1998 HQ_{149}	—	April 25, 1998	La Silla	E. W. Elst	·	3.1 km	MPC · JPL
40026	1998 JF_{3}	—	May 1, 1998	Anderson Mesa	LONEOS	·	4.8 km	MPC · JPL
40027	1998 JH_{4}	—	May 15, 1998	Woomera	F. B. Zoltowski	·	3.0 km	MPC · JPL
40028	1998 KO_{1}	—	May 18, 1998	Anderson Mesa	LONEOS	·	3.2 km	MPC · JPL
40029	1998 KG_{2}	—	May 22, 1998	Socorro	LINEAR	·	8.0 km	MPC · JPL
40030	1998 KL_{2}	—	May 22, 1998	Socorro	LINEAR	·	5.0 km	MPC · JPL
40031	1998 KP_{2}	—	May 22, 1998	Socorro	LINEAR	HNS	4.6 km	MPC · JPL
40032	1998 KD_{10}	—	May 26, 1998	Xinglong	SCAP	slow	4.4 km	MPC · JPL
40033	1998 KX_{10}	—	May 22, 1998	Kitt Peak	Spacewatch	·	3.1 km	MPC · JPL
40034	1998 KB_{11}	—	May 22, 1998	Kitt Peak	Spacewatch	·	6.6 km	MPC · JPL
40035	1998 KO_{15}	—	May 22, 1998	Socorro	LINEAR	EUN · fast	2.9 km	MPC · JPL
40036	1998 KT_{19}	—	May 22, 1998	Socorro	LINEAR	(5)	2.4 km	MPC · JPL
40037	1998 KS_{22}	—	May 22, 1998	Socorro	LINEAR	AEO	4.0 km	MPC · JPL
40038	1998 KT_{22}	—	May 22, 1998	Socorro	LINEAR	·	3.1 km	MPC · JPL
40039	1998 KW_{26}	—	May 21, 1998	Mallorca	Á. López J., R. Pacheco	·	6.0 km	MPC · JPL
40040	1998 KC_{27}	—	May 22, 1998	Socorro	LINEAR	EUN	3.0 km	MPC · JPL
40041	1998 KK_{29}	—	May 22, 1998	Socorro	LINEAR	·	2.4 km	MPC · JPL
40042	1998 KM_{30}	—	May 22, 1998	Socorro	LINEAR	·	3.4 km	MPC · JPL
40043	1998 KV_{30}	—	May 22, 1998	Socorro	LINEAR	·	4.9 km	MPC · JPL
40044	1998 KH_{32}	—	May 22, 1998	Socorro	LINEAR	·	2.8 km	MPC · JPL
40045	1998 KZ_{33}	—	May 22, 1998	Socorro	LINEAR	EUN	3.9 km	MPC · JPL
40046	1998 KT_{34}	—	May 22, 1998	Socorro	LINEAR	·	6.7 km	MPC · JPL
40047	1998 KW_{34}	—	May 22, 1998	Socorro	LINEAR	·	1.8 km	MPC · JPL
40048	1998 KA_{36}	—	May 22, 1998	Socorro	LINEAR	·	11 km	MPC · JPL
40049	1998 KB_{37}	—	May 22, 1998	Socorro	LINEAR	·	4.2 km	MPC · JPL
40050	1998 KP_{37}	—	May 22, 1998	Socorro	LINEAR	·	2.8 km	MPC · JPL
40051	1998 KY_{37}	—	May 22, 1998	Socorro	LINEAR	·	3.7 km	MPC · JPL
40052	1998 KB_{38}	—	May 22, 1998	Socorro	LINEAR	·	3.3 km	MPC · JPL
40053	1998 KH_{41}	—	May 22, 1998	Socorro	LINEAR	·	3.4 km	MPC · JPL
40054	1998 KP_{42}	—	May 27, 1998	Anderson Mesa	LONEOS	PHO	3.8 km	MPC · JPL
40055	1998 KS_{43}	—	May 24, 1998	Socorro	LINEAR	·	5.1 km	MPC · JPL
40056	1998 KT_{44}	—	May 22, 1998	Socorro	LINEAR	·	5.4 km	MPC · JPL
40057	1998 KJ_{45}	—	May 22, 1998	Socorro	LINEAR	·	5.1 km	MPC · JPL
40058	1998 KL_{46}	—	May 22, 1998	Socorro	LINEAR	ERI	5.7 km	MPC · JPL
40059	1998 KR_{47}	—	May 22, 1998	Socorro	LINEAR	·	5.0 km	MPC · JPL
40060	1998 KC_{48}	—	May 22, 1998	Socorro	LINEAR	PHO	3.1 km	MPC · JPL
40061	1998 KQ_{48}	—	May 22, 1998	Socorro	LINEAR	(5)	4.7 km	MPC · JPL
40062	1998 KP_{49}	—	May 23, 1998	Socorro	LINEAR	·	5.4 km	MPC · JPL
40063	1998 KV_{49}	—	May 23, 1998	Socorro	LINEAR	EUN	3.3 km	MPC · JPL
40064	1998 KW_{50}	—	May 23, 1998	Socorro	LINEAR	·	9.4 km	MPC · JPL
40065	1998 KX_{50}	—	May 23, 1998	Socorro	LINEAR	·	3.8 km	MPC · JPL
40066	1998 KF_{51}	—	May 23, 1998	Socorro	LINEAR	·	5.0 km	MPC · JPL
40067	1998 KA_{54}	—	May 23, 1998	Socorro	LINEAR	·	5.0 km	MPC · JPL
40068	1998 KS_{54}	—	May 23, 1998	Socorro	LINEAR	·	3.2 km	MPC · JPL
40069	1998 KQ_{55}	—	May 23, 1998	Socorro	LINEAR	EUN	2.9 km	MPC · JPL
40070	1998 KG_{58}	—	May 26, 1998	Socorro	LINEAR	·	3.3 km	MPC · JPL
40071	1998 KL_{59}	—	May 23, 1998	Socorro	LINEAR	·	2.3 km	MPC · JPL
40072	1998 KZ_{59}	—	May 23, 1998	Socorro	LINEAR	·	2.7 km	MPC · JPL
40073	1998 KN_{60}	—	May 23, 1998	Socorro	LINEAR	PHO	3.2 km	MPC · JPL
40074	1998 KN_{63}	—	May 22, 1998	Socorro	LINEAR	·	4.2 km	MPC · JPL
40075	1998 KS_{63}	—	May 22, 1998	Socorro	LINEAR	(5)	3.6 km	MPC · JPL
40076	1998 LB	—	June 2, 1998	Anderson Mesa	LONEOS	MAR	3.1 km	MPC · JPL
40077	1998 MZ_{4}	—	June 19, 1998	Kitt Peak	Spacewatch	·	3.0 km	MPC · JPL
40078	1998 ML_{8}	—	June 19, 1998	Socorro	LINEAR	·	5.7 km	MPC · JPL
40079	1998 MD_{9}	—	June 19, 1998	Socorro	LINEAR	EUN	5.1 km	MPC · JPL
40080	1998 MY_{9}	—	June 19, 1998	Socorro	LINEAR	WAT	7.5 km	MPC · JPL
40081 Rault	1998 MG_{14}	Rault	June 25, 1998	Caussols	ODAS	MAR	3.8 km	MPC · JPL
40082	1998 ML_{16}	—	June 27, 1998	Kitt Peak	Spacewatch	·	6.6 km	MPC · JPL
40083	1998 MS_{18}	—	June 19, 1998	Caussols	ODAS	·	3.2 km	MPC · JPL
40084	1998 MS_{22}	—	June 24, 1998	Socorro	LINEAR	·	4.7 km	MPC · JPL
40085	1998 MW_{32}	—	June 24, 1998	Socorro	LINEAR	·	2.5 km	MPC · JPL
40086	1998 MK_{33}	—	June 24, 1998	Socorro	LINEAR	·	8.2 km	MPC · JPL
40087	1998 MU_{34}	—	June 24, 1998	Socorro	LINEAR	EUN	3.6 km	MPC · JPL
40088	1998 MJ_{37}	—	June 23, 1998	Anderson Mesa	LONEOS	·	4.4 km	MPC · JPL
40089	1998 MH_{40}	—	June 26, 1998	La Silla	E. W. Elst	·	5.0 km	MPC · JPL
40090	1998 MZ_{40}	—	June 28, 1998	La Silla	E. W. Elst	·	4.4 km	MPC · JPL
40091	1998 MH_{41}	—	June 28, 1998	La Silla	E. W. Elst	·	5.9 km	MPC · JPL
40092 Memel	1998 ME_{47}	Memel	June 28, 1998	La Silla	E. W. Elst	GEF	3.2 km	MPC · JPL
40093	1998 NH	—	July 15, 1998	Prescott	P. G. Comba	·	4.5 km	MPC · JPL
40094	1998 NN	—	July 15, 1998	Anderson Mesa	LONEOS	·	3.7 km	MPC · JPL
40095	1998 OV_{4}	—	July 29, 1998	Višnjan Observatory	Višnjan	·	6.0 km	MPC · JPL
40096	1998 OR_{9}	—	July 26, 1998	La Silla	E. W. Elst	·	8.6 km	MPC · JPL
40097	1998 OB_{13}	—	July 26, 1998	La Silla	E. W. Elst	·	13 km	MPC · JPL
40098	1998 OW_{14}	—	July 26, 1998	La Silla	E. W. Elst	·	5.9 km	MPC · JPL
40099	1998 OB_{15}	—	July 26, 1998	La Silla	E. W. Elst	KOR	5.4 km	MPC · JPL
40100	1998 PV	—	August 12, 1998	Woomera	F. B. Zoltowski	·	4.4 km	MPC · JPL

== 40101–40200 ==
back to top

Designation			Discovery			Properties		Ref
Permanent	Provisional	Named after	Date	Site	Discoverer(s)	Category	Diam.	Ref
40101	1998 QX	—	August 19, 1998	Haleakala	NEAT	·	5.1 km	MPC · JPL
40102	1998 QU_{1}	—	August 19, 1998	Haleakala	NEAT	·	4.1 km	MPC · JPL
40103	1998 QX_{3}	—	August 17, 1998	Višnjan Observatory	Višnjan	·	10 km	MPC · JPL
40104 Stevekerr	1998 QE_{4}	Stevekerr	August 17, 1998	Reedy Creek	J. Broughton	EOS	8.8 km	MPC · JPL
40105	1998 QL_{4}	—	August 17, 1998	Woomera	F. B. Zoltowski	KOR ·	3.8 km	MPC · JPL
40106 Erben	1998 QW_{5}	Erben	August 20, 1998	Ondřejov	P. Pravec	·	3.5 km	MPC · JPL
40107	1998 QB_{7}	—	August 17, 1998	Socorro	LINEAR	·	3.9 km	MPC · JPL
40108	1998 QU_{7}	—	August 17, 1998	Socorro	LINEAR	EOS	6.8 km	MPC · JPL
40109	1998 QC_{8}	—	August 17, 1998	Socorro	LINEAR	·	5.7 km	MPC · JPL
40110	1998 QM_{9}	—	August 17, 1998	Socorro	LINEAR	·	7.1 km	MPC · JPL
40111	1998 QK_{12}	—	August 17, 1998	Socorro	LINEAR	EOS	5.6 km	MPC · JPL
40112	1998 QM_{13}	—	August 17, 1998	Socorro	LINEAR	EUN	3.5 km	MPC · JPL
40113	1998 QZ_{13}	—	August 17, 1998	Socorro	LINEAR	AGN	6.1 km	MPC · JPL
40114	1998 QB_{15}	—	August 17, 1998	Socorro	LINEAR	GEF	3.8 km	MPC · JPL
40115	1998 QB_{19}	—	August 17, 1998	Socorro	LINEAR	EOS	7.0 km	MPC · JPL
40116	1998 QD_{19}	—	August 17, 1998	Socorro	LINEAR	·	6.8 km	MPC · JPL
40117	1998 QG_{21}	—	August 17, 1998	Socorro	LINEAR	·	6.3 km	MPC · JPL
40118	1998 QX_{22}	—	August 17, 1998	Socorro	LINEAR	·	8.3 km	MPC · JPL
40119	1998 QB_{23}	—	August 17, 1998	Socorro	LINEAR	HYG	8.8 km	MPC · JPL
40120	1998 QT_{23}	—	August 17, 1998	Socorro	LINEAR	EOS · fast	11 km	MPC · JPL
40121	1998 QA_{29}	—	August 18, 1998	Reedy Creek	J. Broughton	·	7.1 km	MPC · JPL
40122	1998 QZ_{30}	—	August 17, 1998	Socorro	LINEAR	·	5.6 km	MPC · JPL
40123	1998 QC_{31}	—	August 17, 1998	Socorro	LINEAR	·	14 km	MPC · JPL
40124	1998 QN_{35}	—	August 17, 1998	Socorro	LINEAR	KOR	5.0 km	MPC · JPL
40125	1998 QU_{38}	—	August 17, 1998	Socorro	LINEAR	EOS	4.9 km	MPC · JPL
40126	1998 QL_{40}	—	August 17, 1998	Socorro	LINEAR	·	3.4 km	MPC · JPL
40127	1998 QD_{43}	—	August 17, 1998	Socorro	LINEAR	·	9.0 km	MPC · JPL
40128	1998 QL_{43}	—	August 17, 1998	Socorro	LINEAR	·	8.9 km	MPC · JPL
40129	1998 QY_{45}	—	August 17, 1998	Socorro	LINEAR	·	6.6 km	MPC · JPL
40130	1998 QV_{47}	—	August 17, 1998	Socorro	LINEAR	·	6.0 km	MPC · JPL
40131	1998 QJ_{48}	—	August 17, 1998	Socorro	LINEAR	·	9.1 km	MPC · JPL
40132	1998 QL_{48}	—	August 17, 1998	Socorro	LINEAR	fast	9.2 km	MPC · JPL
40133	1998 QF_{53}	—	August 20, 1998	Anderson Mesa	LONEOS	·	10 km	MPC · JPL
40134 Marsili	1998 QO_{53}	Marsili	August 27, 1998	Colleverde	V. S. Casulli	(40134)	4.3 km	MPC · JPL
40135	1998 QS_{53}	—	August 26, 1998	Farra d'Isonzo	Farra d'Isonzo	EOS	5.0 km	MPC · JPL
40136	1998 QS_{56}	—	August 30, 1998	Kitt Peak	Spacewatch	THM	6.2 km	MPC · JPL
40137	1998 QO_{60}	—	August 28, 1998	Ondřejov	L. Kotková	ADE	11 km	MPC · JPL
40138	1998 QF_{63}	—	August 30, 1998	Xinglong	SCAP	EOS	4.2 km	MPC · JPL
40139	1998 QL_{64}	—	August 24, 1998	Socorro	LINEAR	·	4.5 km	MPC · JPL
40140	1998 QQ_{68}	—	August 24, 1998	Socorro	LINEAR	TIR	7.9 km	MPC · JPL
40141	1998 QL_{70}	—	August 24, 1998	Socorro	LINEAR	·	7.9 km	MPC · JPL
40142	1998 QT_{70}	—	August 24, 1998	Socorro	LINEAR	·	9.4 km	MPC · JPL
40143	1998 QW_{70}	—	August 24, 1998	Socorro	LINEAR	·	13 km	MPC · JPL
40144	1998 QC_{71}	—	August 24, 1998	Socorro	LINEAR	·	9.4 km	MPC · JPL
40145	1998 QF_{71}	—	August 24, 1998	Socorro	LINEAR	·	5.8 km	MPC · JPL
40146	1998 QR_{71}	—	August 24, 1998	Socorro	LINEAR	EOS	9.2 km	MPC · JPL
40147	1998 QB_{72}	—	August 24, 1998	Socorro	LINEAR	·	14 km	MPC · JPL
40148	1998 QB_{73}	—	August 24, 1998	Socorro	LINEAR	·	9.3 km	MPC · JPL
40149	1998 QF_{74}	—	August 24, 1998	Socorro	LINEAR	EOS	5.8 km	MPC · JPL
40150	1998 QF_{75}	—	August 24, 1998	Socorro	LINEAR	·	12 km	MPC · JPL
40151	1998 QO_{75}	—	August 24, 1998	Socorro	LINEAR	·	6.4 km	MPC · JPL
40152	1998 QA_{77}	—	August 24, 1998	Socorro	LINEAR	EOS	6.8 km	MPC · JPL
40153	1998 QD_{79}	—	August 24, 1998	Socorro	LINEAR	EOS	6.3 km	MPC · JPL
40154	1998 QE_{83}	—	August 24, 1998	Socorro	LINEAR	·	6.8 km	MPC · JPL
40155	1998 QA_{84}	—	August 24, 1998	Socorro	LINEAR	·	7.6 km	MPC · JPL
40156	1998 QH_{86}	—	August 24, 1998	Socorro	LINEAR	·	5.9 km	MPC · JPL
40157	1998 QA_{88}	—	August 24, 1998	Socorro	LINEAR	EOS	8.4 km	MPC · JPL
40158	1998 QP_{88}	—	August 24, 1998	Socorro	LINEAR	·	7.6 km	MPC · JPL
40159	1998 QC_{90}	—	August 24, 1998	Socorro	LINEAR	·	5.4 km	MPC · JPL
40160	1998 QL_{91}	—	August 28, 1998	Socorro	LINEAR	H	1.7 km	MPC · JPL
40161	1998 QO_{91}	—	August 28, 1998	Socorro	LINEAR	EUN	5.2 km	MPC · JPL
40162	1998 QK_{95}	—	August 19, 1998	Socorro	LINEAR	EOS	7.1 km	MPC · JPL
40163	1998 QC_{96}	—	August 19, 1998	Socorro	LINEAR	EOS	4.3 km	MPC · JPL
40164	1998 QW_{99}	—	August 26, 1998	La Silla	E. W. Elst	·	5.5 km	MPC · JPL
40165	1998 QP_{102}	—	August 26, 1998	La Silla	E. W. Elst	EOS	9.8 km	MPC · JPL
40166	1998 QW_{102}	—	August 26, 1998	La Silla	E. W. Elst	·	8.1 km	MPC · JPL
40167	1998 QF_{103}	—	August 26, 1998	La Silla	E. W. Elst	·	8.8 km	MPC · JPL
40168	1998 QW_{104}	—	August 26, 1998	La Silla	E. W. Elst	·	7.7 km	MPC · JPL
40169	1998 QG_{105}	—	August 25, 1998	La Silla	E. W. Elst	·	8.3 km	MPC · JPL
40170	1998 RK	—	September 1, 1998	Woomera	F. B. Zoltowski	·	9.6 km	MPC · JPL
40171	1998 RS	—	September 11, 1998	Zeno	T. Stafford	·	10 km	MPC · JPL
40172	1998 RQ_{6}	—	September 15, 1998	Anderson Mesa	LONEOS	·	7.0 km	MPC · JPL
40173	1998 RE_{7}	—	September 12, 1998	Kitt Peak	Spacewatch	KOR	3.9 km	MPC · JPL
40174	1998 RY_{12}	—	September 14, 1998	Kitt Peak	Spacewatch	·	8.9 km	MPC · JPL
40175	1998 RE_{16}	—	September 14, 1998	Xinglong	SCAP	·	9.6 km	MPC · JPL
40176	1998 RH_{27}	—	September 14, 1998	Socorro	LINEAR	EOS	6.2 km	MPC · JPL
40177	1998 RU_{28}	—	September 14, 1998	Socorro	LINEAR	THM	7.2 km	MPC · JPL
40178	1998 RU_{36}	—	September 14, 1998	Socorro	LINEAR	·	8.2 km	MPC · JPL
40179	1998 RM_{38}	—	September 14, 1998	Socorro	LINEAR	EOS	5.1 km	MPC · JPL
40180	1998 RR_{48}	—	September 14, 1998	Socorro	LINEAR	·	6.3 km	MPC · JPL
40181	1998 RN_{50}	—	September 14, 1998	Socorro	LINEAR	·	6.1 km	MPC · JPL
40182	1998 RO_{55}	—	September 14, 1998	Socorro	LINEAR	·	2.6 km	MPC · JPL
40183	1998 RP_{58}	—	September 14, 1998	Socorro	LINEAR	·	5.3 km	MPC · JPL
40184	1998 RQ_{58}	—	September 14, 1998	Socorro	LINEAR	·	13 km	MPC · JPL
40185	1998 RL_{60}	—	September 14, 1998	Socorro	LINEAR	EOS	5.5 km	MPC · JPL
40186	1998 RN_{60}	—	September 14, 1998	Socorro	LINEAR	EOS	5.9 km	MPC · JPL
40187	1998 RR_{61}	—	September 14, 1998	Socorro	LINEAR	CYB	12 km	MPC · JPL
40188	1998 RQ_{64}	—	September 14, 1998	Socorro	LINEAR	·	7.8 km	MPC · JPL
40189	1998 RR_{67}	—	September 14, 1998	Socorro	LINEAR	·	7.0 km	MPC · JPL
40190	1998 RL_{74}	—	September 14, 1998	Socorro	LINEAR	HYG	7.8 km	MPC · JPL
40191	1998 RM_{75}	—	September 14, 1998	Socorro	LINEAR	·	10 km	MPC · JPL
40192	1998 RV_{75}	—	September 14, 1998	Socorro	LINEAR	·	4.6 km	MPC · JPL
40193	1998 RF_{77}	—	September 14, 1998	Socorro	LINEAR	·	10 km	MPC · JPL
40194	1998 RG_{78}	—	September 14, 1998	Socorro	LINEAR	·	5.7 km	MPC · JPL
40195	1998 RU_{78}	—	September 14, 1998	Socorro	LINEAR	HYG	10 km	MPC · JPL
40196	1998 RM_{80}	—	September 14, 1998	Socorro	LINEAR	·	12 km	MPC · JPL
40197	1998 RP_{80}	—	September 14, 1998	Socorro	LINEAR	VER	15 km	MPC · JPL
40198 Azarkhalatbari	1998 SA_{1}	Azarkhalatbari	September 16, 1998	Caussols	ODAS	THM	8.3 km	MPC · JPL
40199	1998 SE_{1}	—	September 16, 1998	Caussols	ODAS	EOS	5.4 km	MPC · JPL
40200	1998 SW_{9}	—	September 18, 1998	Višnjan Observatory	Višnjan	·	8.2 km	MPC · JPL

== 40201–40300 ==
back to top

Designation			Discovery			Properties		Ref
Permanent	Provisional	Named after	Date	Site	Discoverer(s)	Category	Diam.	Ref
40201 Besely	1998 SO_{13}	Besely	September 21, 1998	Caussols	ODAS	·	8.8 km	MPC · JPL
40202	1998 SN_{26}	—	September 24, 1998	Kleť	Kleť	·	8.3 km	MPC · JPL
40203	1998 SP_{27}	—	September 24, 1998	Catalina	CSS	H	1.2 km	MPC · JPL
40204	1998 SV_{27}	—	September 23, 1998	Goodricke-Pigott	R. A. Tucker	·	11 km	MPC · JPL
40205	1998 SU_{30}	—	September 19, 1998	Kitt Peak	Spacewatch	·	7.4 km	MPC · JPL
40206 Lhenice	1998 SB_{36}	Lhenice	September 26, 1998	Kleť	J. Tichá, M. Tichý	·	7.1 km	MPC · JPL
40207	1998 SE_{44}	—	September 23, 1998	Kitt Peak	Spacewatch	(1298)	17 km	MPC · JPL
40208	1998 SK_{53}	—	September 16, 1998	Anderson Mesa	LONEOS	·	11 km	MPC · JPL
40209 Morrispodolak	1998 SU_{55}	Morrispodolak	September 16, 1998	Anderson Mesa	LONEOS	HYG	7.7 km	MPC · JPL
40210 Peixinho	1998 SL_{56}	Peixinho	September 16, 1998	Anderson Mesa	LONEOS	EMA	10 km	MPC · JPL
40211	1998 SC_{57}	—	September 17, 1998	Anderson Mesa	LONEOS	·	6.9 km	MPC · JPL
40212	1998 SC_{58}	—	September 17, 1998	Anderson Mesa	LONEOS	·	9.3 km	MPC · JPL
40213	1998 SQ_{58}	—	September 17, 1998	Anderson Mesa	LONEOS	(1118)	13 km	MPC · JPL
40214	1998 SR_{63}	—	September 29, 1998	Xinglong	SCAP	·	6.0 km	MPC · JPL
40215	1998 SZ_{69}	—	September 21, 1998	Socorro	LINEAR	EOS	5.8 km	MPC · JPL
40216	1998 SF_{79}	—	September 26, 1998	Socorro	LINEAR	EOS	5.7 km	MPC · JPL
40217	1998 SM_{87}	—	September 26, 1998	Socorro	LINEAR	EOS	5.5 km	MPC · JPL
40218	1998 SQ_{97}	—	September 26, 1998	Socorro	LINEAR	·	9.6 km	MPC · JPL
40219	1998 SX_{111}	—	September 26, 1998	Socorro	LINEAR	·	11 km	MPC · JPL
40220	1998 SH_{122}	—	September 26, 1998	Socorro	LINEAR	HYG	8.9 km	MPC · JPL
40221	1998 SG_{136}	—	September 26, 1998	Socorro	LINEAR	·	12 km	MPC · JPL
40222	1998 SJ_{137}	—	September 26, 1998	Socorro	LINEAR	·	7.0 km	MPC · JPL
40223	1998 SX_{142}	—	September 26, 1998	Socorro	LINEAR	AEG	12 km	MPC · JPL
40224	1998 SJ_{143}	—	September 23, 1998	Caussols	ODAS	EOS	4.4 km	MPC · JPL
40225	1998 SX_{144}	—	September 20, 1998	La Silla	E. W. Elst	THM	6.6 km	MPC · JPL
40226	1998 SA_{145}	—	September 20, 1998	La Silla	E. W. Elst	·	11 km	MPC · JPL
40227 Tahiti	1998 SR_{145}	Tahiti	September 20, 1998	La Silla	E. W. Elst	T_{j} (2.98) · HIL · 3:2	20 km	MPC · JPL
40228	1998 TR_{1}	—	October 12, 1998	Reedy Creek	J. Broughton	·	3.7 km	MPC · JPL
40229	1998 TO_{3}	—	October 14, 1998	Socorro	LINEAR	H	1.3 km	MPC · JPL
40230 Rožmberk	1998 TJ_{6}	Rožmberk	October 14, 1998	Kleť	M. Tichý	THM	7.6 km	MPC · JPL
40231	1998 TS_{6}	—	October 14, 1998	Xinglong	SCAP	H	1.2 km	MPC · JPL
40232	1998 UD	—	October 16, 1998	Catalina	CSS	PHO	3.4 km	MPC · JPL
40233 Baradeau	1998 UH_{2}	Baradeau	October 20, 1998	Caussols	ODAS	·	8.6 km	MPC · JPL
40234	1998 UG_{4}	—	October 21, 1998	Reedy Creek	J. Broughton	·	5.6 km	MPC · JPL
40235	1998 UX_{7}	—	October 23, 1998	Višnjan Observatory	K. Korlević	·	10 km	MPC · JPL
40236	1998 UF_{33}	—	October 28, 1998	Socorro	LINEAR	·	5.7 km	MPC · JPL
40237	1998 VM_{6}	—	November 11, 1998	Nachi-Katsuura	Y. Shimizu, T. Urata	L4 · slow	20 km	MPC · JPL
40238	1998 VR_{13}	—	November 10, 1998	Socorro	LINEAR	3:2	11 km	MPC · JPL
40239	1998 VY_{16}	—	November 10, 1998	Socorro	LINEAR	·	5.9 km	MPC · JPL
40240	1998 VV_{37}	—	November 10, 1998	Socorro	LINEAR	·	10 km	MPC · JPL
40241 Deienno	1998 VA_{46}	Deienno	November 15, 1998	Anderson Mesa	LONEOS	H	1.6 km	MPC · JPL
40242	1998 VU_{46}	—	November 14, 1998	Kitt Peak	Spacewatch	HYG	7.8 km	MPC · JPL
40243	1998 WH_{1}	—	November 18, 1998	Catalina	CSS	PHO	3.0 km	MPC · JPL
40244	1998 WP_{4}	—	November 17, 1998	Catalina	CSS	H	3.1 km	MPC · JPL
40245	1998 WO_{7}	—	November 23, 1998	Socorro	LINEAR	·	2.5 km	MPC · JPL
40246	1998 WV_{18}	—	November 21, 1998	Socorro	LINEAR	3:2	20 km	MPC · JPL
40247	1998 XK_{4}	—	December 11, 1998	Socorro	LINEAR	H	1.7 km	MPC · JPL
40248 Yukikajiura	1998 XF_{5}	Yukikajiura	December 12, 1998	Goodricke-Pigott	R. A. Tucker	·	6.4 km	MPC · JPL
40249	1998 XM_{11}	—	December 13, 1998	Oizumi	T. Kobayashi	·	2.6 km	MPC · JPL
40250	1998 XG_{16}	—	December 14, 1998	Socorro	LINEAR	H	1.7 km	MPC · JPL
40251	1998 XK_{87}	—	December 15, 1998	Socorro	LINEAR	·	2.2 km	MPC · JPL
40252	1998 YE_{6}	—	December 22, 1998	Catalina	CSS	PHO	2.0 km	MPC · JPL
40253	1999 BB_{1}	—	January 17, 1999	Catalina	CSS	H	1.9 km	MPC · JPL
40254	1999 BB_{26}	—	January 21, 1999	Monte Agliale	S. Donati, Santangelo, M. M. M.	·	5.6 km	MPC · JPL
40255	1999 CN_{4}	—	February 12, 1999	Prescott	P. G. Comba	·	1.9 km	MPC · JPL
40256	1999 CM_{6}	—	February 10, 1999	Socorro	LINEAR	H	1.4 km	MPC · JPL
40257	1999 CZ_{56}	—	February 10, 1999	Socorro	LINEAR	·	1.7 km	MPC · JPL
40258	1999 CF_{61}	—	February 12, 1999	Socorro	LINEAR	·	1.8 km	MPC · JPL
40259	1999 CZ_{85}	—	February 10, 1999	Socorro	LINEAR	V	3.0 km	MPC · JPL
40260	1999 CU_{98}	—	February 10, 1999	Socorro	LINEAR	·	3.6 km	MPC · JPL
40261	1999 CD_{117}	—	February 12, 1999	Socorro	LINEAR	V	2.6 km	MPC · JPL
40262	1999 CF_{156}	—	February 7, 1999	Kitt Peak	Spacewatch	L4	10 km	MPC · JPL
40263	1999 FQ_{5}	—	March 18, 1999	Kitt Peak	Spacewatch	AMO +1km	950 m	MPC · JPL
40264	1999 FJ_{7}	—	March 20, 1999	Socorro	LINEAR	H	1.1 km	MPC · JPL
40265	1999 FQ_{22}	—	March 19, 1999	Socorro	LINEAR	·	2.8 km	MPC · JPL
40266	1999 GS	—	April 5, 1999	Višnjan Observatory	K. Korlević	·	4.2 km	MPC · JPL
40267	1999 GJ_{4}	—	April 10, 1999	Socorro	LINEAR	APO +1km	1.6 km	MPC · JPL
40268	1999 GU_{8}	—	April 10, 1999	Anderson Mesa	LONEOS	·	2.1 km	MPC · JPL
40269	1999 GP_{25}	—	April 6, 1999	Socorro	LINEAR	·	1.7 km	MPC · JPL
40270	1999 JE	—	May 6, 1999	Socorro	LINEAR	H	1.7 km	MPC · JPL
40271	1999 JT	—	May 4, 1999	Xinglong	SCAP	PHO	3.2 km	MPC · JPL
40272	1999 JA_{7}	—	May 8, 1999	Catalina	CSS	slow	3.3 km	MPC · JPL
40273	1999 JS_{7}	—	May 13, 1999	Reedy Creek	J. Broughton	·	5.4 km	MPC · JPL
40274	1999 JT_{14}	—	May 10, 1999	Socorro	LINEAR	·	2.4 km	MPC · JPL
40275	1999 JW_{15}	—	May 10, 1999	Socorro	LINEAR	V	1.6 km	MPC · JPL
40276	1999 JR_{19}	—	May 10, 1999	Socorro	LINEAR	·	2.2 km	MPC · JPL
40277	1999 JL_{30}	—	May 10, 1999	Socorro	LINEAR	·	4.4 km	MPC · JPL
40278	1999 JC_{34}	—	May 10, 1999	Socorro	LINEAR	·	2.3 km	MPC · JPL
40279	1999 JD_{35}	—	May 10, 1999	Socorro	LINEAR	V	2.1 km	MPC · JPL
40280	1999 JV_{44}	—	May 10, 1999	Socorro	LINEAR	·	1.6 km	MPC · JPL
40281	1999 JY_{47}	—	May 10, 1999	Socorro	LINEAR	·	9.0 km	MPC · JPL
40282	1999 JD_{48}	—	May 10, 1999	Socorro	LINEAR	EUN	6.6 km	MPC · JPL
40283	1999 JO_{50}	—	May 10, 1999	Socorro	LINEAR	EUN	4.8 km	MPC · JPL
40284	1999 JE_{52}	—	May 10, 1999	Socorro	LINEAR	·	1.8 km	MPC · JPL
40285	1999 JT_{52}	—	May 10, 1999	Socorro	LINEAR	·	1.6 km	MPC · JPL
40286	1999 JN_{53}	—	May 10, 1999	Socorro	LINEAR	·	1.8 km	MPC · JPL
40287	1999 JS_{61}	—	May 10, 1999	Socorro	LINEAR	·	3.1 km	MPC · JPL
40288	1999 JP_{64}	—	May 10, 1999	Socorro	LINEAR	NYS	3.0 km	MPC · JPL
40289	1999 JS_{64}	—	May 10, 1999	Socorro	LINEAR	·	6.2 km	MPC · JPL
40290	1999 JV_{64}	—	May 10, 1999	Socorro	LINEAR	·	2.0 km	MPC · JPL
40291	1999 JX_{71}	—	May 12, 1999	Socorro	LINEAR	·	2.4 km	MPC · JPL
40292	1999 JD_{72}	—	May 12, 1999	Socorro	LINEAR	·	2.6 km	MPC · JPL
40293	1999 JG_{73}	—	May 12, 1999	Socorro	LINEAR	·	2.2 km	MPC · JPL
40294	1999 JT_{73}	—	May 12, 1999	Socorro	LINEAR	·	2.1 km	MPC · JPL
40295	1999 JX_{73}	—	May 12, 1999	Socorro	LINEAR	·	1.9 km	MPC · JPL
40296	1999 JE_{74}	—	May 12, 1999	Socorro	LINEAR	·	2.5 km	MPC · JPL
40297	1999 JJ_{74}	—	May 12, 1999	Socorro	LINEAR	·	3.9 km	MPC · JPL
40298	1999 JD_{81}	—	May 13, 1999	Socorro	LINEAR	·	2.2 km	MPC · JPL
40299	1999 JN_{90}	—	May 12, 1999	Socorro	LINEAR	·	3.8 km	MPC · JPL
40300	1999 JT_{93}	—	May 12, 1999	Socorro	LINEAR	·	1.7 km	MPC · JPL

== 40301–40400 ==
back to top

Designation			Discovery			Properties		Ref
Permanent	Provisional	Named after	Date	Site	Discoverer(s)	Category	Diam.	Ref
40301	1999 JU_{93}	—	May 12, 1999	Socorro	LINEAR	·	1.9 km	MPC · JPL
40302	1999 JD_{98}	—	May 12, 1999	Socorro	LINEAR	·	3.7 km	MPC · JPL
40303	1999 JU_{98}	—	May 12, 1999	Socorro	LINEAR	·	1.4 km	MPC · JPL
40304	1999 JX_{104}	—	May 12, 1999	Socorro	LINEAR	·	6.2 km	MPC · JPL
40305	1999 JP_{111}	—	May 13, 1999	Socorro	LINEAR	·	3.5 km	MPC · JPL
40306	1999 JN_{112}	—	May 13, 1999	Socorro	LINEAR	·	2.1 km	MPC · JPL
40307	1999 JN_{115}	—	May 13, 1999	Socorro	LINEAR	·	2.1 km	MPC · JPL
40308	1999 JV_{120}	—	May 13, 1999	Socorro	LINEAR	V	2.2 km	MPC · JPL
40309	1999 JH_{131}	—	May 13, 1999	Socorro	LINEAR	·	1.5 km	MPC · JPL
40310	1999 KU_{4}	—	May 18, 1999	Socorro	LINEAR	·	2.7 km	MPC · JPL
40311	1999 KH_{13}	—	May 18, 1999	Socorro	LINEAR	·	2.7 km	MPC · JPL
40312	1999 KZ_{13}	—	May 18, 1999	Socorro	LINEAR	·	1.8 km	MPC · JPL
40313	1999 KV_{14}	—	May 18, 1999	Socorro	LINEAR	·	2.2 km	MPC · JPL
40314	1999 KR_{16}	—	May 16, 1999	La Silla	A. C. Delsanti, Hainaut, O. R.	other TNO	271 km	MPC · JPL
40315	1999 LS	—	June 4, 1999	Socorro	LINEAR	·	1.3 km	MPC · JPL
40316	1999 LU_{4}	—	June 7, 1999	Socorro	LINEAR	PHO	8.8 km	MPC · JPL
40317	1999 LO_{7}	—	June 9, 1999	Catalina	CSS	·	3.4 km	MPC · JPL
40318	1999 LQ_{9}	—	June 8, 1999	Socorro	LINEAR	EUN	3.4 km	MPC · JPL
40319	1999 LR_{11}	—	June 9, 1999	Socorro	LINEAR	·	2.0 km	MPC · JPL
40320	1999 LP_{14}	—	June 9, 1999	Socorro	LINEAR	·	3.2 km	MPC · JPL
40321	1999 LA_{21}	—	June 9, 1999	Socorro	LINEAR	·	2.3 km	MPC · JPL
40322	1999 LU_{23}	—	June 9, 1999	Socorro	LINEAR	·	2.8 km	MPC · JPL
40323	1999 LF_{25}	—	June 9, 1999	Socorro	LINEAR	·	4.6 km	MPC · JPL
40324	1999 LY_{30}	—	June 12, 1999	Kitt Peak	Spacewatch	·	2.9 km	MPC · JPL
40325	1999 LW_{33}	—	June 11, 1999	Catalina	CSS	·	8.9 km	MPC · JPL
40326	1999 MA	—	June 18, 1999	Prescott	P. G. Comba	·	4.1 km	MPC · JPL
40327	1999 MB	—	June 17, 1999	Reedy Creek	J. Broughton	·	2.7 km	MPC · JPL
40328 Dow	1999 MK	Dow	June 20, 1999	Junk Bond	D. Healy	·	2.3 km	MPC · JPL
40329	1999 ML	—	June 20, 1999	Catalina	CSS	AMO +1km	1.0 km	MPC · JPL
40330	1999 MN_{1}	—	June 20, 1999	Anderson Mesa	LONEOS	·	3.5 km	MPC · JPL
40331	1999 MS_{1}	—	June 17, 1999	Farpoint	G. Hug, G. Bell	·	1.8 km	MPC · JPL
40332	1999 NK	—	July 6, 1999	Reedy Creek	J. Broughton	·	4.6 km	MPC · JPL
40333	1999 NO_{1}	—	July 12, 1999	Socorro	LINEAR	·	12 km	MPC · JPL
40334	1999 NS_{4}	—	July 11, 1999	Višnjan Observatory	K. Korlević	NYS	2.4 km	MPC · JPL
40335	1999 NJ_{5}	—	July 15, 1999	Višnjan Observatory	K. Korlević	V	3.0 km	MPC · JPL
40336	1999 NG_{6}	—	July 13, 1999	Socorro	LINEAR	·	2.8 km	MPC · JPL
40337	1999 NN_{7}	—	July 13, 1999	Socorro	LINEAR	NYS	2.1 km	MPC · JPL
40338	1999 NB_{8}	—	July 13, 1999	Socorro	LINEAR	NYS	4.5 km	MPC · JPL
40339	1999 NF_{8}	—	July 13, 1999	Socorro	LINEAR	·	3.6 km	MPC · JPL
40340	1999 NR_{8}	—	July 13, 1999	Socorro	LINEAR	·	4.5 km	MPC · JPL
40341	1999 NU_{8}	—	July 13, 1999	Socorro	LINEAR	NYS	3.4 km	MPC · JPL
40342	1999 NB_{9}	—	July 13, 1999	Socorro	LINEAR	·	2.3 km	MPC · JPL
40343	1999 NH_{9}	—	July 13, 1999	Socorro	LINEAR	·	4.3 km	MPC · JPL
40344	1999 NN_{9}	—	July 13, 1999	Socorro	LINEAR	·	2.1 km	MPC · JPL
40345	1999 NT_{9}	—	July 13, 1999	Socorro	LINEAR	(2076)	1.8 km	MPC · JPL
40346	1999 ND_{10}	—	July 13, 1999	Socorro	LINEAR	V	1.6 km	MPC · JPL
40347	1999 NH_{10}	—	July 13, 1999	Socorro	LINEAR	·	2.2 km	MPC · JPL
40348	1999 NO_{10}	—	July 13, 1999	Socorro	LINEAR	(7744)	4.2 km	MPC · JPL
40349	1999 NF_{11}	—	July 13, 1999	Socorro	LINEAR	NYS	2.5 km	MPC · JPL
40350	1999 NO_{11}	—	July 13, 1999	Socorro	LINEAR	V	1.7 km	MPC · JPL
40351	1999 NZ_{11}	—	July 13, 1999	Socorro	LINEAR	·	3.3 km	MPC · JPL
40352	1999 ND_{12}	—	July 13, 1999	Socorro	LINEAR	·	2.7 km	MPC · JPL
40353	1999 NB_{13}	—	July 14, 1999	Socorro	LINEAR	PHO	6.2 km	MPC · JPL
40354	1999 NQ_{15}	—	July 14, 1999	Socorro	LINEAR	·	1.8 km	MPC · JPL
40355	1999 NH_{17}	—	July 14, 1999	Socorro	LINEAR	·	1.7 km	MPC · JPL
40356	1999 NZ_{17}	—	July 14, 1999	Socorro	LINEAR	·	4.3 km	MPC · JPL
40357	1999 NM_{18}	—	July 14, 1999	Socorro	LINEAR	·	3.3 km	MPC · JPL
40358	1999 ND_{19}	—	July 14, 1999	Socorro	LINEAR	MAS	2.4 km	MPC · JPL
40359	1999 NT_{20}	—	July 14, 1999	Socorro	LINEAR	·	2.4 km	MPC · JPL
40360	1999 NE_{21}	—	July 14, 1999	Socorro	LINEAR	·	2.4 km	MPC · JPL
40361	1999 NG_{21}	—	July 14, 1999	Socorro	LINEAR	·	3.1 km	MPC · JPL
40362	1999 NY_{21}	—	July 14, 1999	Socorro	LINEAR	NYS	2.2 km	MPC · JPL
40363	1999 NM_{23}	—	July 14, 1999	Socorro	LINEAR	·	3.4 km	MPC · JPL
40364	1999 ND_{24}	—	July 14, 1999	Socorro	LINEAR	·	1.9 km	MPC · JPL
40365	1999 NE_{26}	—	July 14, 1999	Socorro	LINEAR	·	3.3 km	MPC · JPL
40366	1999 NF_{27}	—	July 14, 1999	Socorro	LINEAR	·	1.8 km	MPC · JPL
40367	1999 NA_{28}	—	July 14, 1999	Socorro	LINEAR	·	2.6 km	MPC · JPL
40368	1999 NS_{28}	—	July 14, 1999	Socorro	LINEAR	V	2.4 km	MPC · JPL
40369	1999 NY_{28}	—	July 14, 1999	Socorro	LINEAR	MAS	2.5 km	MPC · JPL
40370	1999 NZ_{28}	—	July 14, 1999	Socorro	LINEAR	·	2.4 km	MPC · JPL
40371	1999 NF_{30}	—	July 14, 1999	Socorro	LINEAR	·	2.6 km	MPC · JPL
40372	1999 NG_{34}	—	July 14, 1999	Socorro	LINEAR	·	3.6 km	MPC · JPL
40373	1999 NF_{36}	—	July 14, 1999	Socorro	LINEAR	·	2.9 km	MPC · JPL
40374	1999 NG_{36}	—	July 14, 1999	Socorro	LINEAR	·	2.2 km	MPC · JPL
40375	1999 NO_{36}	—	July 14, 1999	Socorro	LINEAR	·	4.4 km	MPC · JPL
40376	1999 NF_{37}	—	July 14, 1999	Socorro	LINEAR	·	2.0 km	MPC · JPL
40377	1999 NM_{39}	—	July 14, 1999	Socorro	LINEAR	NYS	2.4 km	MPC · JPL
40378	1999 NW_{40}	—	July 14, 1999	Socorro	LINEAR	·	3.8 km	MPC · JPL
40379	1999 NG_{41}	—	July 14, 1999	Socorro	LINEAR	NYS	2.7 km	MPC · JPL
40380	1999 NX_{42}	—	July 14, 1999	Socorro	LINEAR	·	4.5 km	MPC · JPL
40381	1999 NK_{44}	—	July 13, 1999	Socorro	LINEAR	·	4.2 km	MPC · JPL
40382	1999 NK_{47}	—	July 13, 1999	Socorro	LINEAR	·	2.2 km	MPC · JPL
40383	1999 NW_{47}	—	July 13, 1999	Socorro	LINEAR	·	2.2 km	MPC · JPL
40384	1999 NC_{49}	—	July 13, 1999	Socorro	LINEAR	·	4.8 km	MPC · JPL
40385	1999 NE_{49}	—	July 13, 1999	Socorro	LINEAR	·	2.4 km	MPC · JPL
40386	1999 NK_{49}	—	July 13, 1999	Socorro	LINEAR	·	4.0 km	MPC · JPL
40387	1999 NL_{49}	—	July 13, 1999	Socorro	LINEAR	·	12 km	MPC · JPL
40388	1999 NY_{49}	—	July 13, 1999	Socorro	LINEAR	·	2.5 km	MPC · JPL
40389	1999 ND_{50}	—	July 13, 1999	Socorro	LINEAR	·	5.3 km	MPC · JPL
40390	1999 NR_{51}	—	July 12, 1999	Socorro	LINEAR	·	4.3 km	MPC · JPL
40391	1999 NR_{52}	—	July 12, 1999	Socorro	LINEAR	EUN	4.5 km	MPC · JPL
40392	1999 NS_{53}	—	July 12, 1999	Socorro	LINEAR	·	4.9 km	MPC · JPL
40393	1999 NW_{53}	—	July 12, 1999	Socorro	LINEAR	·	2.9 km	MPC · JPL
40394	1999 NX_{53}	—	July 12, 1999	Socorro	LINEAR	·	3.2 km	MPC · JPL
40395	1999 NP_{54}	—	July 12, 1999	Socorro	LINEAR	·	4.2 km	MPC · JPL
40396	1999 NT_{54}	—	July 12, 1999	Socorro	LINEAR	·	3.4 km	MPC · JPL
40397	1999 NY_{55}	—	July 12, 1999	Socorro	LINEAR	·	4.6 km	MPC · JPL
40398	1999 NL_{57}	—	July 13, 1999	Socorro	LINEAR	·	7.2 km	MPC · JPL
40399	1999 NW_{63}	—	July 14, 1999	Socorro	LINEAR	·	2.9 km	MPC · JPL
40400	1999 NJ_{64}	—	July 14, 1999	Socorro	LINEAR	·	5.1 km	MPC · JPL

== 40401–40500 ==
back to top

Designation			Discovery			Properties		Ref
Permanent	Provisional	Named after	Date	Site	Discoverer(s)	Category	Diam.	Ref
40401	1999 NS_{64}	—	July 14, 1999	Socorro	LINEAR	·	2.1 km	MPC · JPL
40402	1999 NY_{64}	—	July 14, 1999	Socorro	LINEAR	·	2.3 km	MPC · JPL
40403	1999 NJ_{65}	—	July 12, 1999	Socorro	LINEAR	·	3.4 km	MPC · JPL
40404	1999 OB	—	July 16, 1999	Višnjan Observatory	K. Korlević	·	3.5 km	MPC · JPL
40405	1999 OU	—	July 17, 1999	Bergisch Gladbach	W. Bickel	MRX	2.6 km	MPC · JPL
40406	1999 OR_{1}	—	July 16, 1999	Socorro	LINEAR	V	2.5 km	MPC · JPL
40407	1999 QT_{2}	—	August 31, 1999	Oohira	T. Urata	·	3.9 km	MPC · JPL
40408	1999 RO_{2}	—	September 4, 1999	Catalina	CSS	V	2.0 km	MPC · JPL
40409 Taichikato	1999 RS_{2}	Taichikato	September 6, 1999	Ceccano	G. Masi	NYS	2.8 km	MPC · JPL
40410 Příhoda	1999 RJ_{3}	Příhoda	September 4, 1999	Ondřejov	L. Kotková	·	4.3 km	MPC · JPL
40411	1999 RM_{3}	—	September 6, 1999	Gekko	T. Kagawa	·	3.5 km	MPC · JPL
40412	1999 RE_{9}	—	September 4, 1999	Kitt Peak	Spacewatch	·	5.5 km	MPC · JPL
40413	1999 RS_{10}	—	September 7, 1999	Socorro	LINEAR	PHO	5.2 km	MPC · JPL
40414	1999 RP_{11}	—	September 7, 1999	Socorro	LINEAR	MAS	2.4 km	MPC · JPL
40415	1999 RB_{13}	—	September 7, 1999	Socorro	LINEAR	PHO	2.8 km	MPC · JPL
40416	1999 RO_{14}	—	September 7, 1999	Socorro	LINEAR	·	3.6 km	MPC · JPL
40417	1999 RD_{16}	—	September 7, 1999	Socorro	LINEAR	·	10 km	MPC · JPL
40418	1999 RK_{19}	—	September 7, 1999	Socorro	LINEAR	EOS	5.0 km	MPC · JPL
40419	1999 RV_{20}	—	September 7, 1999	Socorro	LINEAR	AGN	3.0 km	MPC · JPL
40420	1999 RJ_{21}	—	September 7, 1999	Socorro	LINEAR	·	3.9 km	MPC · JPL
40421	1999 RZ_{22}	—	September 7, 1999	Socorro	LINEAR	·	4.4 km	MPC · JPL
40422	1999 RF_{23}	—	September 7, 1999	Socorro	LINEAR	NYS	3.5 km	MPC · JPL
40423	1999 RJ_{23}	—	September 7, 1999	Socorro	LINEAR	·	5.5 km	MPC · JPL
40424	1999 RB_{24}	—	September 7, 1999	Socorro	LINEAR	·	3.0 km	MPC · JPL
40425	1999 RQ_{25}	—	September 7, 1999	Socorro	LINEAR	·	3.5 km	MPC · JPL
40426	1999 RV_{25}	—	September 7, 1999	Socorro	LINEAR	HYG	7.5 km	MPC · JPL
40427	1999 RN_{26}	—	September 7, 1999	Socorro	LINEAR	·	4.6 km	MPC · JPL
40428	1999 RZ_{26}	—	September 7, 1999	Socorro	LINEAR	·	5.9 km	MPC · JPL
40429	1999 RL_{27}	—	September 7, 1999	Višnjan Observatory	K. Korlević	EUN · slow	9.3 km	MPC · JPL
40430	1999 RL_{28}	—	September 7, 1999	Socorro	LINEAR	·	2.3 km	MPC · JPL
40431	1999 RK_{29}	—	September 8, 1999	Socorro	LINEAR	PHO	3.4 km	MPC · JPL
40432	1999 RW_{29}	—	September 8, 1999	Socorro	LINEAR	·	7.4 km	MPC · JPL
40433	1999 RQ_{30}	—	September 8, 1999	Socorro	LINEAR	·	4.6 km	MPC · JPL
40434	1999 RH_{32}	—	September 9, 1999	Višnjan Observatory	K. Korlević	GEF	3.5 km	MPC · JPL
40435	1999 RL_{32}	—	September 9, 1999	Višnjan Observatory	K. Korlević	·	5.9 km	MPC · JPL
40436 Sylviecoyaud	1999 RQ_{32}	Sylviecoyaud	September 10, 1999	Campo Catino	Catino, Campo	·	5.8 km	MPC · JPL
40437	1999 RU_{33}	—	September 6, 1999	Farpoint	G. Bell, G. Hug	·	4.2 km	MPC · JPL
40438	1999 RV_{33}	—	September 6, 1999	Farpoint	G. Bell, G. Hug	KOR	3.6 km	MPC · JPL
40439	1999 RF_{34}	—	September 9, 1999	Višnjan Observatory	K. Korlević	THM	8.7 km	MPC · JPL
40440 Dobrovský	1999 RU_{34}	Dobrovský	September 11, 1999	Ondřejov	P. Pravec, P. Kušnirák	EOS	4.6 km	MPC · JPL
40441 Jungmann	1999 RW_{34}	Jungmann	September 11, 1999	Ondřejov	P. Pravec, P. Kušnirák	·	3.1 km	MPC · JPL
40442	1999 RO_{35}	—	September 11, 1999	Višnjan Observatory	K. Korlević	·	5.9 km	MPC · JPL
40443	1999 RU_{35}	—	September 7, 1999	Uccle	E. W. Elst	·	2.6 km	MPC · JPL
40444 Palacký	1999 RV_{35}	Palacký	September 12, 1999	Ondřejov	P. Pravec, M. Wolf	KOR	2.8 km	MPC · JPL
40445	1999 RY_{35}	—	September 12, 1999	Prescott	P. G. Comba	V	1.4 km	MPC · JPL
40446	1999 RN_{36}	—	September 12, 1999	Črni Vrh	Skvarč, J.	EUN	5.8 km	MPC · JPL
40447 Lorenzoni	1999 RC_{37}	Lorenzoni	September 11, 1999	Bologna	San Vittore	·	2.5 km	MPC · JPL
40448	1999 RT_{37}	—	September 12, 1999	Višnjan Observatory	K. Korlević	·	2.3 km	MPC · JPL
40449	1999 RV_{37}	—	September 12, 1999	Višnjan Observatory	K. Korlević	·	2.8 km	MPC · JPL
40450	1999 RX_{37}	—	September 12, 1999	Višnjan Observatory	K. Korlević	EOS	5.2 km	MPC · JPL
40451	1999 RD_{38}	—	September 13, 1999	Višnjan Observatory	K. Korlević	MAR	3.2 km	MPC · JPL
40452	1999 RV_{38}	—	September 12, 1999	Reedy Creek	J. Broughton	V	1.6 km	MPC · JPL
40453	1999 RX_{38}	—	September 13, 1999	Reedy Creek	J. Broughton	V	2.4 km	MPC · JPL
40454	1999 RY_{39}	—	September 12, 1999	Catalina	CSS	GEF	3.1 km	MPC · JPL
40455	1999 RC_{40}	—	September 12, 1999	Catalina	CSS	·	6.6 km	MPC · JPL
40456	1999 RV_{41}	—	September 13, 1999	Višnjan Observatory	K. Korlević	THM	7.4 km	MPC · JPL
40457 Williamkuhn	1999 RG_{43}	Williamkuhn	September 4, 1999	OCA-Anza	M. Collins, White, M.	·	2.1 km	MPC · JPL
40458	1999 RH_{43}	—	September 14, 1999	Višnjan Observatory	K. Korlević	·	1.8 km	MPC · JPL
40459 Rektorys	1999 RK_{43}	Rektorys	September 14, 1999	Ondřejov	P. Pravec, P. Kušnirák	GEF	3.6 km	MPC · JPL
40460	1999 RV_{43}	—	September 15, 1999	Višnjan Observatory	K. Korlević	·	3.1 km	MPC · JPL
40461	1999 RW_{43}	—	September 15, 1999	Višnjan Observatory	K. Korlević	EOS	6.0 km	MPC · JPL
40462	1999 RC_{44}	—	September 15, 1999	Višnjan Observatory	Višnjan	·	5.1 km	MPC · JPL
40463 Frankkameny	1999 RE_{44}	Frankkameny	September 15, 1999	Calgary	Billings, G. W.	·	3.9 km	MPC · JPL
40464	1999 RM_{44}	—	September 8, 1999	Socorro	LINEAR	(194)	4.8 km	MPC · JPL
40465	1999 RQ_{44}	—	September 14, 1999	Višnjan Observatory	K. Korlević	·	3.4 km	MPC · JPL
40466	1999 RU_{44}	—	September 14, 1999	Črni Vrh	Mikuž, H.	·	3.5 km	MPC · JPL
40467	1999 RE_{46}	—	September 7, 1999	Socorro	LINEAR	V	2.3 km	MPC · JPL
40468	1999 RF_{46}	—	September 7, 1999	Socorro	LINEAR	·	3.6 km	MPC · JPL
40469	1999 RM_{47}	—	September 7, 1999	Socorro	LINEAR	·	2.9 km	MPC · JPL
40470	1999 RN_{47}	—	September 7, 1999	Socorro	LINEAR	slow	3.3 km	MPC · JPL
40471	1999 RX_{47}	—	September 7, 1999	Socorro	LINEAR	·	7.6 km	MPC · JPL
40472	1999 RU_{49}	—	September 7, 1999	Socorro	LINEAR	NYS	3.5 km	MPC · JPL
40473	1999 RR_{50}	—	September 7, 1999	Socorro	LINEAR	NYS ·	4.6 km	MPC · JPL
40474	1999 RG_{51}	—	September 7, 1999	Socorro	LINEAR	·	3.3 km	MPC · JPL
40475	1999 RE_{53}	—	September 7, 1999	Socorro	LINEAR	·	2.5 km	MPC · JPL
40476	1999 RH_{53}	—	September 7, 1999	Socorro	LINEAR	V	2.5 km	MPC · JPL
40477	1999 RS_{54}	—	September 7, 1999	Socorro	LINEAR	·	3.5 km	MPC · JPL
40478	1999 RT_{54}	—	September 7, 1999	Socorro	LINEAR	MAS	1.7 km	MPC · JPL
40479	1999 RQ_{60}	—	September 7, 1999	Socorro	LINEAR	·	3.1 km	MPC · JPL
40480	1999 RK_{61}	—	September 7, 1999	Socorro	LINEAR	RAF	3.4 km	MPC · JPL
40481	1999 RQ_{61}	—	September 7, 1999	Socorro	LINEAR	NYS ·	4.9 km	MPC · JPL
40482	1999 RA_{62}	—	September 7, 1999	Socorro	LINEAR	EUN	3.4 km	MPC · JPL
40483	1999 RE_{62}	—	September 7, 1999	Socorro	LINEAR	·	3.4 km	MPC · JPL
40484	1999 RA_{63}	—	September 7, 1999	Socorro	LINEAR	·	3.4 km	MPC · JPL
40485	1999 RY_{63}	—	September 7, 1999	Socorro	LINEAR	·	3.4 km	MPC · JPL
40486	1999 RJ_{64}	—	September 7, 1999	Socorro	LINEAR	V	1.7 km	MPC · JPL
40487	1999 RP_{66}	—	September 7, 1999	Socorro	LINEAR	·	5.1 km	MPC · JPL
40488	1999 RV_{66}	—	September 7, 1999	Socorro	LINEAR	·	5.9 km	MPC · JPL
40489	1999 RH_{67}	—	September 7, 1999	Socorro	LINEAR	·	3.0 km	MPC · JPL
40490	1999 RY_{67}	—	September 7, 1999	Socorro	LINEAR	·	3.5 km	MPC · JPL
40491	1999 RJ_{68}	—	September 7, 1999	Socorro	LINEAR	KOR	3.1 km	MPC · JPL
40492	1999 RO_{69}	—	September 7, 1999	Socorro	LINEAR	·	1.8 km	MPC · JPL
40493	1999 RD_{71}	—	September 7, 1999	Socorro	LINEAR	·	2.4 km	MPC · JPL
40494	1999 RG_{72}	—	September 7, 1999	Socorro	LINEAR	·	3.2 km	MPC · JPL
40495	1999 RQ_{74}	—	September 7, 1999	Socorro	LINEAR	NAE	5.0 km	MPC · JPL
40496	1999 RD_{76}	—	September 7, 1999	Socorro	LINEAR	·	4.5 km	MPC · JPL
40497	1999 RR_{78}	—	September 7, 1999	Socorro	LINEAR	EOS	4.2 km	MPC · JPL
40498	1999 RG_{80}	—	September 7, 1999	Socorro	LINEAR	·	5.8 km	MPC · JPL
40499	1999 RK_{81}	—	September 7, 1999	Socorro	LINEAR	·	2.6 km	MPC · JPL
40500	1999 RE_{82}	—	September 7, 1999	Socorro	LINEAR	·	7.7 km	MPC · JPL

== 40501–40600 ==
back to top

Designation			Discovery			Properties		Ref
Permanent	Provisional	Named after	Date	Site	Discoverer(s)	Category	Diam.	Ref
40501	1999 RM_{82}	—	September 7, 1999	Socorro	LINEAR	slow	6.2 km	MPC · JPL
40502	1999 RT_{82}	—	September 7, 1999	Socorro	LINEAR	·	3.0 km	MPC · JPL
40503	1999 RA_{83}	—	September 7, 1999	Socorro	LINEAR	·	2.7 km	MPC · JPL
40504	1999 RC_{84}	—	September 7, 1999	Socorro	LINEAR	·	3.0 km	MPC · JPL
40505	1999 RJ_{84}	—	September 7, 1999	Socorro	LINEAR	·	3.6 km	MPC · JPL
40506	1999 RB_{86}	—	September 7, 1999	Socorro	LINEAR	(5)	3.0 km	MPC · JPL
40507	1999 RK_{86}	—	September 7, 1999	Socorro	LINEAR	·	5.9 km	MPC · JPL
40508	1999 RU_{86}	—	September 7, 1999	Socorro	LINEAR	·	3.0 km	MPC · JPL
40509	1999 RJ_{87}	—	September 7, 1999	Socorro	LINEAR	·	4.9 km	MPC · JPL
40510	1999 RU_{87}	—	September 7, 1999	Socorro	LINEAR	KOR	3.8 km	MPC · JPL
40511	1999 RE_{88}	—	September 7, 1999	Socorro	LINEAR	NYS · fast	1.9 km	MPC · JPL
40512	1999 RP_{88}	—	September 7, 1999	Socorro	LINEAR	·	3.9 km	MPC · JPL
40513	1999 RS_{88}	—	September 7, 1999	Socorro	LINEAR	·	4.8 km	MPC · JPL
40514	1999 RC_{89}	—	September 7, 1999	Socorro	LINEAR	·	3.0 km	MPC · JPL
40515	1999 RE_{89}	—	September 7, 1999	Socorro	LINEAR	·	4.9 km	MPC · JPL
40516	1999 RY_{89}	—	September 7, 1999	Socorro	LINEAR	KOR	5.3 km	MPC · JPL
40517	1999 RA_{92}	—	September 7, 1999	Socorro	LINEAR	·	3.1 km	MPC · JPL
40518	1999 RZ_{93}	—	September 7, 1999	Socorro	LINEAR	·	2.5 km	MPC · JPL
40519	1999 RQ_{94}	—	September 7, 1999	Socorro	LINEAR	WIT	2.4 km	MPC · JPL
40520	1999 RG_{95}	—	September 7, 1999	Socorro	LINEAR	GEF	4.0 km	MPC · JPL
40521	1999 RL_{95}	—	September 7, 1999	Socorro	LINEAR	·	2.6 km	MPC · JPL
40522	1999 RT_{95}	—	September 7, 1999	Socorro	LINEAR	·	5.4 km	MPC · JPL
40523	1999 RX_{95}	—	September 7, 1999	Socorro	LINEAR	·	2.9 km	MPC · JPL
40524	1999 RA_{96}	—	September 7, 1999	Socorro	LINEAR	·	3.2 km	MPC · JPL
40525	1999 RO_{96}	—	September 7, 1999	Socorro	LINEAR	·	1.6 km	MPC · JPL
40526	1999 RV_{96}	—	September 7, 1999	Socorro	LINEAR	(12739)	3.3 km	MPC · JPL
40527	1999 RS_{98}	—	September 7, 1999	Socorro	LINEAR	·	2.5 km	MPC · JPL
40528	1999 RT_{98}	—	September 7, 1999	Socorro	LINEAR	·	11 km	MPC · JPL
40529	1999 RC_{99}	—	September 7, 1999	Socorro	LINEAR	·	2.8 km	MPC · JPL
40530	1999 RE_{99}	—	September 8, 1999	Socorro	LINEAR	V	1.6 km	MPC · JPL
40531	1999 RB_{100}	—	September 8, 1999	Socorro	LINEAR	·	3.2 km	MPC · JPL
40532	1999 RY_{100}	—	September 8, 1999	Socorro	LINEAR	·	5.8 km	MPC · JPL
40533	1999 RH_{102}	—	September 8, 1999	Socorro	LINEAR	PHO	2.7 km	MPC · JPL
40534	1999 RT_{102}	—	September 8, 1999	Socorro	LINEAR	·	3.8 km	MPC · JPL
40535	1999 RG_{103}	—	September 8, 1999	Socorro	LINEAR	EUN	3.4 km	MPC · JPL
40536	1999 RL_{103}	—	September 8, 1999	Socorro	LINEAR	·	2.0 km	MPC · JPL
40537	1999 RT_{103}	—	September 8, 1999	Socorro	LINEAR	·	4.0 km	MPC · JPL
40538	1999 RV_{103}	—	September 8, 1999	Socorro	LINEAR	V	3.3 km	MPC · JPL
40539	1999 RL_{104}	—	September 8, 1999	Socorro	LINEAR	ADE	6.2 km	MPC · JPL
40540	1999 RZ_{104}	—	September 8, 1999	Socorro	LINEAR	NYS	3.0 km	MPC · JPL
40541	1999 RE_{106}	—	September 8, 1999	Socorro	LINEAR	GEF	3.5 km	MPC · JPL
40542	1999 RS_{106}	—	September 8, 1999	Socorro	LINEAR	·	3.5 km	MPC · JPL
40543	1999 RZ_{107}	—	September 8, 1999	Socorro	LINEAR	WIT	2.6 km	MPC · JPL
40544	1999 RA_{108}	—	September 8, 1999	Socorro	LINEAR	·	3.8 km	MPC · JPL
40545	1999 RO_{109}	—	September 8, 1999	Socorro	LINEAR	EUN	3.5 km	MPC · JPL
40546	1999 RY_{109}	—	September 8, 1999	Socorro	LINEAR	EOS	8.6 km	MPC · JPL
40547	1999 RH_{111}	—	September 9, 1999	Socorro	LINEAR	EUN	3.5 km	MPC · JPL
40548	1999 RK_{112}	—	September 9, 1999	Socorro	LINEAR	·	3.9 km	MPC · JPL
40549	1999 RP_{112}	—	September 9, 1999	Socorro	LINEAR	·	2.2 km	MPC · JPL
40550	1999 RM_{113}	—	September 9, 1999	Socorro	LINEAR	·	2.3 km	MPC · JPL
40551	1999 RS_{113}	—	September 9, 1999	Socorro	LINEAR	·	5.4 km	MPC · JPL
40552	1999 RX_{114}	—	September 9, 1999	Socorro	LINEAR	·	7.9 km	MPC · JPL
40553	1999 RE_{115}	—	September 9, 1999	Socorro	LINEAR	NYS ·	5.4 km	MPC · JPL
40554	1999 RG_{115}	—	September 9, 1999	Socorro	LINEAR	·	3.4 km	MPC · JPL
40555	1999 RM_{115}	—	September 9, 1999	Socorro	LINEAR	·	3.7 km	MPC · JPL
40556	1999 RS_{115}	—	September 9, 1999	Socorro	LINEAR	·	3.0 km	MPC · JPL
40557	1999 RX_{116}	—	September 9, 1999	Socorro	LINEAR	EUN	3.1 km	MPC · JPL
40558	1999 RE_{118}	—	September 9, 1999	Socorro	LINEAR	·	2.7 km	MPC · JPL
40559	1999 RO_{118}	—	September 9, 1999	Socorro	LINEAR	·	3.3 km	MPC · JPL
40560	1999 RQ_{118}	—	September 9, 1999	Socorro	LINEAR	·	7.5 km	MPC · JPL
40561	1999 RR_{118}	—	September 9, 1999	Socorro	LINEAR	V	1.5 km	MPC · JPL
40562	1999 RB_{121}	—	September 9, 1999	Socorro	LINEAR	slow	2.5 km	MPC · JPL
40563	1999 RZ_{122}	—	September 9, 1999	Socorro	LINEAR	WIT	2.6 km	MPC · JPL
40564	1999 RZ_{123}	—	September 9, 1999	Socorro	LINEAR	·	5.9 km	MPC · JPL
40565	1999 RD_{124}	—	September 9, 1999	Socorro	LINEAR	·	2.0 km	MPC · JPL
40566	1999 RE_{124}	—	September 9, 1999	Socorro	LINEAR	·	3.2 km	MPC · JPL
40567	1999 RB_{126}	—	September 9, 1999	Socorro	LINEAR	·	4.1 km	MPC · JPL
40568	1999 RF_{126}	—	September 9, 1999	Socorro	LINEAR	·	4.4 km	MPC · JPL
40569	1999 RH_{128}	—	September 9, 1999	Socorro	LINEAR	·	4.9 km	MPC · JPL
40570	1999 RV_{128}	—	September 9, 1999	Socorro	LINEAR	·	3.3 km	MPC · JPL
40571	1999 RD_{129}	—	September 9, 1999	Socorro	LINEAR	·	4.5 km	MPC · JPL
40572	1999 RP_{129}	—	September 9, 1999	Socorro	LINEAR	V	1.9 km	MPC · JPL
40573	1999 RE_{130}	—	September 9, 1999	Socorro	LINEAR	·	4.9 km	MPC · JPL
40574	1999 RO_{130}	—	September 9, 1999	Socorro	LINEAR	·	2.9 km	MPC · JPL
40575	1999 RS_{130}	—	September 9, 1999	Socorro	LINEAR	·	3.3 km	MPC · JPL
40576	1999 RM_{133}	—	September 9, 1999	Socorro	LINEAR	EOS	5.7 km	MPC · JPL
40577	1999 RQ_{134}	—	September 9, 1999	Socorro	LINEAR	·	3.0 km	MPC · JPL
40578	1999 RT_{134}	—	September 9, 1999	Socorro	LINEAR	·	6.9 km	MPC · JPL
40579	1999 RJ_{135}	—	September 9, 1999	Socorro	LINEAR	NYS	1.8 km	MPC · JPL
40580	1999 RN_{135}	—	September 9, 1999	Socorro	LINEAR	(5)	2.9 km	MPC · JPL
40581	1999 RK_{136}	—	September 9, 1999	Socorro	LINEAR	·	1.7 km	MPC · JPL
40582	1999 RC_{137}	—	September 9, 1999	Socorro	LINEAR	NYS	1.7 km	MPC · JPL
40583	1999 RR_{137}	—	September 9, 1999	Socorro	LINEAR	·	3.4 km	MPC · JPL
40584	1999 RJ_{140}	—	September 9, 1999	Socorro	LINEAR	ADE	6.1 km	MPC · JPL
40585	1999 RL_{140}	—	September 9, 1999	Socorro	LINEAR	·	2.9 km	MPC · JPL
40586	1999 RZ_{140}	—	September 9, 1999	Socorro	LINEAR	THM	6.6 km	MPC · JPL
40587	1999 RB_{141}	—	September 9, 1999	Socorro	LINEAR	·	2.1 km	MPC · JPL
40588	1999 RF_{141}	—	September 9, 1999	Socorro	LINEAR	·	4.1 km	MPC · JPL
40589	1999 RP_{141}	—	September 9, 1999	Socorro	LINEAR	·	2.5 km	MPC · JPL
40590	1999 RQ_{141}	—	September 9, 1999	Socorro	LINEAR	·	2.1 km	MPC · JPL
40591	1999 RR_{142}	—	September 9, 1999	Socorro	LINEAR	PHO	3.4 km	MPC · JPL
40592	1999 RM_{143}	—	September 9, 1999	Socorro	LINEAR	·	4.0 km	MPC · JPL
40593	1999 RZ_{144}	—	September 9, 1999	Socorro	LINEAR	·	2.9 km	MPC · JPL
40594	1999 RW_{146}	—	September 9, 1999	Socorro	LINEAR	V	2.0 km	MPC · JPL
40595	1999 RY_{146}	—	September 9, 1999	Socorro	LINEAR	·	2.7 km	MPC · JPL
40596	1999 RA_{148}	—	September 9, 1999	Socorro	LINEAR	·	6.6 km	MPC · JPL
40597	1999 RG_{149}	—	September 9, 1999	Socorro	LINEAR	(12739)	4.9 km	MPC · JPL
40598	1999 RM_{149}	—	September 9, 1999	Socorro	LINEAR	·	1.6 km	MPC · JPL
40599	1999 RX_{150}	—	September 9, 1999	Socorro	LINEAR	·	2.7 km	MPC · JPL
40600	1999 RZ_{150}	—	September 9, 1999	Socorro	LINEAR	·	2.3 km	MPC · JPL

== 40601–40700 ==
back to top

Designation			Discovery			Properties		Ref
Permanent	Provisional	Named after	Date	Site	Discoverer(s)	Category	Diam.	Ref
40601	1999 RQ_{151}	—	September 9, 1999	Socorro	LINEAR	KOR	3.6 km	MPC · JPL
40602	1999 RO_{152}	—	September 9, 1999	Socorro	LINEAR	·	2.7 km	MPC · JPL
40603	1999 RD_{154}	—	September 9, 1999	Socorro	LINEAR	GEF	4.0 km	MPC · JPL
40604	1999 RO_{154}	—	September 9, 1999	Socorro	LINEAR	·	5.9 km	MPC · JPL
40605	1999 RA_{155}	—	September 9, 1999	Socorro	LINEAR	·	3.1 km	MPC · JPL
40606	1999 RR_{157}	—	September 9, 1999	Socorro	LINEAR	DOR	6.2 km	MPC · JPL
40607	1999 RH_{158}	—	September 9, 1999	Socorro	LINEAR	·	4.2 km	MPC · JPL
40608	1999 RS_{159}	—	September 9, 1999	Socorro	LINEAR	·	1.7 km	MPC · JPL
40609	1999 RD_{160}	—	September 9, 1999	Socorro	LINEAR	·	2.9 km	MPC · JPL
40610	1999 RF_{160}	—	September 9, 1999	Socorro	LINEAR	LEO	5.6 km	MPC · JPL
40611	1999 RS_{160}	—	September 9, 1999	Socorro	LINEAR	NYS	2.8 km	MPC · JPL
40612	1999 RM_{162}	—	September 9, 1999	Socorro	LINEAR	EOS	4.6 km	MPC · JPL
40613	1999 RR_{162}	—	September 9, 1999	Socorro	LINEAR	·	3.2 km	MPC · JPL
40614	1999 RW_{162}	—	September 9, 1999	Socorro	LINEAR	·	3.6 km	MPC · JPL
40615	1999 RD_{163}	—	September 9, 1999	Socorro	LINEAR	·	5.8 km	MPC · JPL
40616	1999 RW_{163}	—	September 9, 1999	Socorro	LINEAR	KOR	3.4 km	MPC · JPL
40617	1999 RZ_{163}	—	September 9, 1999	Socorro	LINEAR	·	4.6 km	MPC · JPL
40618	1999 RG_{164}	—	September 9, 1999	Socorro	LINEAR	·	3.2 km	MPC · JPL
40619	1999 RQ_{165}	—	September 9, 1999	Socorro	LINEAR	·	3.4 km	MPC · JPL
40620	1999 RH_{168}	—	September 9, 1999	Socorro	LINEAR	·	3.5 km	MPC · JPL
40621	1999 RG_{169}	—	September 9, 1999	Socorro	LINEAR	GEF	3.0 km	MPC · JPL
40622	1999 RY_{169}	—	September 9, 1999	Socorro	LINEAR	NYS	1.5 km	MPC · JPL
40623	1999 RO_{170}	—	September 9, 1999	Socorro	LINEAR	·	7.5 km	MPC · JPL
40624	1999 RJ_{171}	—	September 9, 1999	Socorro	LINEAR	·	1.9 km	MPC · JPL
40625	1999 RJ_{172}	—	September 9, 1999	Socorro	LINEAR	·	6.3 km	MPC · JPL
40626	1999 RP_{172}	—	September 9, 1999	Socorro	LINEAR	·	2.6 km	MPC · JPL
40627	1999 RJ_{173}	—	September 9, 1999	Socorro	LINEAR	·	4.3 km	MPC · JPL
40628	1999 RV_{173}	—	September 9, 1999	Socorro	LINEAR	KRM	6.0 km	MPC · JPL
40629	1999 RX_{173}	—	September 9, 1999	Socorro	LINEAR	·	4.3 km	MPC · JPL
40630	1999 RA_{174}	—	September 9, 1999	Socorro	LINEAR	·	3.9 km	MPC · JPL
40631	1999 RX_{174}	—	September 9, 1999	Socorro	LINEAR	·	2.4 km	MPC · JPL
40632	1999 RJ_{175}	—	September 9, 1999	Socorro	LINEAR	·	2.2 km	MPC · JPL
40633	1999 RR_{177}	—	September 9, 1999	Socorro	LINEAR	·	2.4 km	MPC · JPL
40634	1999 RH_{178}	—	September 9, 1999	Socorro	LINEAR	·	1.9 km	MPC · JPL
40635	1999 RV_{179}	—	September 9, 1999	Socorro	LINEAR	·	4.6 km	MPC · JPL
40636	1999 RW_{179}	—	September 9, 1999	Socorro	LINEAR	·	3.4 km	MPC · JPL
40637	1999 RP_{180}	—	September 9, 1999	Socorro	LINEAR	·	2.8 km	MPC · JPL
40638	1999 RS_{180}	—	September 9, 1999	Socorro	LINEAR	·	2.2 km	MPC · JPL
40639	1999 RW_{180}	—	September 9, 1999	Socorro	LINEAR	·	3.9 km	MPC · JPL
40640	1999 RQ_{181}	—	September 9, 1999	Socorro	LINEAR	THM	6.9 km	MPC · JPL
40641	1999 RV_{181}	—	September 9, 1999	Socorro	LINEAR	·	2.3 km	MPC · JPL
40642	1999 RW_{181}	—	September 9, 1999	Socorro	LINEAR	·	3.2 km	MPC · JPL
40643	1999 RG_{182}	—	September 9, 1999	Socorro	LINEAR	NYS	4.6 km	MPC · JPL
40644	1999 RH_{183}	—	September 9, 1999	Socorro	LINEAR	·	5.0 km	MPC · JPL
40645	1999 RS_{183}	—	September 9, 1999	Socorro	LINEAR	·	4.1 km	MPC · JPL
40646	1999 RV_{184}	—	September 9, 1999	Socorro	LINEAR	·	2.8 km	MPC · JPL
40647	1999 RD_{185}	—	September 9, 1999	Socorro	LINEAR	·	3.2 km	MPC · JPL
40648	1999 RO_{185}	—	September 9, 1999	Socorro	LINEAR	·	2.7 km	MPC · JPL
40649	1999 RY_{186}	—	September 9, 1999	Socorro	LINEAR	·	3.3 km	MPC · JPL
40650	1999 RS_{187}	—	September 9, 1999	Socorro	LINEAR	·	3.6 km	MPC · JPL
40651	1999 RJ_{189}	—	September 9, 1999	Socorro	LINEAR	·	3.8 km	MPC · JPL
40652	1999 RP_{189}	—	September 9, 1999	Socorro	LINEAR	·	3.1 km	MPC · JPL
40653	1999 RS_{190}	—	September 10, 1999	Socorro	LINEAR	NYS	1.4 km	MPC · JPL
40654	1999 RH_{191}	—	September 11, 1999	Socorro	LINEAR	·	3.2 km	MPC · JPL
40655	1999 RM_{191}	—	September 15, 1999	Kitt Peak	Spacewatch	(5)	3.7 km	MPC · JPL
40656	1999 RY_{191}	—	September 11, 1999	Socorro	LINEAR	·	5.4 km	MPC · JPL
40657	1999 RE_{192}	—	September 13, 1999	Socorro	LINEAR	·	6.1 km	MPC · JPL
40658	1999 RD_{193}	—	September 13, 1999	Socorro	LINEAR	·	5.1 km	MPC · JPL
40659	1999 RK_{193}	—	September 13, 1999	Socorro	LINEAR	·	4.9 km	MPC · JPL
40660	1999 RH_{194}	—	September 7, 1999	Socorro	LINEAR	·	4.3 km	MPC · JPL
40661	1999 RS_{194}	—	September 7, 1999	Socorro	LINEAR	(1298)	13 km	MPC · JPL
40662	1999 RD_{195}	—	September 8, 1999	Socorro	LINEAR	GEF	5.4 km	MPC · JPL
40663	1999 RR_{195}	—	September 8, 1999	Socorro	LINEAR	·	4.4 km	MPC · JPL
40664	1999 RF_{196}	—	September 8, 1999	Socorro	LINEAR	MAR	3.5 km	MPC · JPL
40665	1999 RE_{197}	—	September 8, 1999	Socorro	LINEAR	V	1.8 km	MPC · JPL
40666	1999 RS_{197}	—	September 8, 1999	Socorro	LINEAR	·	2.8 km	MPC · JPL
40667	1999 RB_{200}	—	September 8, 1999	Socorro	LINEAR	MAR	5.1 km	MPC · JPL
40668	1999 RX_{200}	—	September 8, 1999	Socorro	LINEAR	·	2.5 km	MPC · JPL
40669	1999 RN_{201}	—	September 8, 1999	Socorro	LINEAR	EOS	5.1 km	MPC · JPL
40670	1999 RW_{201}	—	September 8, 1999	Socorro	LINEAR	EUN	4.3 km	MPC · JPL
40671	1999 RE_{202}	—	September 8, 1999	Socorro	LINEAR	·	7.5 km	MPC · JPL
40672	1999 RJ_{202}	—	September 8, 1999	Socorro	LINEAR	·	3.5 km	MPC · JPL
40673	1999 RL_{203}	—	September 8, 1999	Socorro	LINEAR	·	4.1 km	MPC · JPL
40674	1999 RX_{203}	—	September 8, 1999	Socorro	LINEAR	EUN	3.6 km	MPC · JPL
40675	1999 RU_{205}	—	September 8, 1999	Socorro	LINEAR	EOS	4.7 km	MPC · JPL
40676	1999 RN_{206}	—	September 8, 1999	Socorro	LINEAR	MAR	3.3 km	MPC · JPL
40677	1999 RP_{206}	—	September 8, 1999	Socorro	LINEAR	slow	11 km	MPC · JPL
40678	1999 RY_{206}	—	September 8, 1999	Socorro	LINEAR	·	3.3 km	MPC · JPL
40679	1999 RO_{207}	—	September 8, 1999	Socorro	LINEAR	EOS	5.1 km	MPC · JPL
40680	1999 RY_{209}	—	September 8, 1999	Socorro	LINEAR	·	3.2 km	MPC · JPL
40681	1999 RL_{211}	—	September 8, 1999	Socorro	LINEAR	·	7.5 km	MPC · JPL
40682	1999 RM_{211}	—	September 8, 1999	Socorro	LINEAR	·	7.6 km	MPC · JPL
40683	1999 RB_{213}	—	September 9, 1999	Socorro	LINEAR	·	4.0 km	MPC · JPL
40684 Vanhoeck	1999 RE_{214}	Vanhoeck	September 8, 1999	Uccle	T. Pauwels	AGN	2.4 km	MPC · JPL
40685	1999 RL_{217}	—	September 3, 1999	Anderson Mesa	LONEOS	·	3.7 km	MPC · JPL
40686	1999 RD_{220}	—	September 4, 1999	Anderson Mesa	LONEOS	·	6.6 km	MPC · JPL
40687	1999 RS_{220}	—	September 5, 1999	Catalina	CSS	·	4.1 km	MPC · JPL
40688	1999 RL_{223}	—	September 7, 1999	Socorro	LINEAR	TEL	5.0 km	MPC · JPL
40689	1999 RG_{224}	—	September 7, 1999	Anderson Mesa	LONEOS	ADE	6.2 km	MPC · JPL
40690	1999 RV_{225}	—	September 4, 1999	Catalina	CSS	·	2.8 km	MPC · JPL
40691	1999 RH_{227}	—	September 5, 1999	Catalina	CSS	·	3.5 km	MPC · JPL
40692	1999 RE_{228}	—	September 8, 1999	Catalina	CSS	V	3.4 km	MPC · JPL
40693	1999 RX_{229}	—	September 8, 1999	Catalina	CSS	·	3.6 km	MPC · JPL
40694	1999 RY_{230}	—	September 8, 1999	Catalina	CSS	·	4.5 km	MPC · JPL
40695	1999 RA_{231}	—	September 8, 1999	Catalina	CSS	·	2.9 km	MPC · JPL
40696	1999 RU_{231}	—	September 9, 1999	Anderson Mesa	LONEOS	·	3.2 km	MPC · JPL
40697	1999 RZ_{231}	—	September 9, 1999	Anderson Mesa	LONEOS	V	3.0 km	MPC · JPL
40698	1999 RT_{232}	—	September 8, 1999	Catalina	CSS	·	2.9 km	MPC · JPL
40699	1999 RB_{235}	—	September 8, 1999	Catalina	CSS	EUN	3.9 km	MPC · JPL
40700	1999 RF_{235}	—	September 8, 1999	Catalina	CSS	·	2.0 km	MPC · JPL

== 40701–40800 ==
back to top

Designation			Discovery			Properties		Ref
Permanent	Provisional	Named after	Date	Site	Discoverer(s)	Category	Diam.	Ref
40701	1999 RG_{235}	—	September 8, 1999	Catalina	CSS	MRX	3.9 km	MPC · JPL
40702	1999 RH_{236}	—	September 8, 1999	Catalina	CSS	EUN	4.3 km	MPC · JPL
40703	1999 RR_{237}	—	September 8, 1999	Catalina	CSS	·	4.6 km	MPC · JPL
40704	1999 RB_{238}	—	September 8, 1999	Catalina	CSS	GEF	3.1 km	MPC · JPL
40705	1999 RG_{239}	—	September 8, 1999	Catalina	CSS	·	6.7 km	MPC · JPL
40706 Milam	1999 RO_{240}	Milam	September 11, 1999	Anderson Mesa	LONEOS	·	10 km	MPC · JPL
40707	1999 RV_{240}	—	September 11, 1999	Anderson Mesa	LONEOS	·	3.7 km	MPC · JPL
40708	1999 RR_{242}	—	September 4, 1999	Anderson Mesa	LONEOS	·	3.8 km	MPC · JPL
40709	1999 RW_{242}	—	September 4, 1999	Anderson Mesa	LONEOS	EUN	4.5 km	MPC · JPL
40710	1999 RS_{245}	—	September 7, 1999	Anderson Mesa	LONEOS	GEF	3.7 km	MPC · JPL
40711	1999 RU_{245}	—	September 7, 1999	Anderson Mesa	LONEOS	(5)	3.2 km	MPC · JPL
40712	1999 RB_{246}	—	September 7, 1999	Anderson Mesa	LONEOS	·	5.7 km	MPC · JPL
40713	1999 RT_{248}	—	September 7, 1999	Kitt Peak	Spacewatch	KOR	3.1 km	MPC · JPL
40714	1999 RS_{252}	—	September 8, 1999	Socorro	LINEAR	EOS	5.1 km	MPC · JPL
40715	1999 RX_{253}	—	September 7, 1999	Socorro	LINEAR	·	2.0 km	MPC · JPL
40716	1999 SL	—	September 16, 1999	Reedy Creek	J. Broughton	DOR	11 km	MPC · JPL
40717	1999 SC_{2}	—	September 18, 1999	Socorro	LINEAR	PHO	3.9 km	MPC · JPL
40718	1999 SU_{2}	—	September 21, 1999	Ondřejov	L. Kotková	HYG	6.2 km	MPC · JPL
40719	1999 SZ_{2}	—	September 29, 1999	Socorro	LINEAR	·	2.2 km	MPC · JPL
40720	1999 SL_{6}	—	September 30, 1999	Socorro	LINEAR	·	2.9 km	MPC · JPL
40721	1999 SM_{6}	—	September 30, 1999	Socorro	LINEAR	EUN	3.6 km	MPC · JPL
40722	1999 SO_{6}	—	September 30, 1999	Socorro	LINEAR	EUN	3.0 km	MPC · JPL
40723	1999 SF_{7}	—	September 29, 1999	Socorro	LINEAR	·	4.1 km	MPC · JPL
40724	1999 SY_{8}	—	September 29, 1999	Socorro	LINEAR	EUN	5.4 km	MPC · JPL
40725	1999 SP_{9}	—	September 30, 1999	Stroncone	Santa Lucia	EUN	3.0 km	MPC · JPL
40726	1999 SG_{11}	—	September 30, 1999	Catalina	CSS	EOS	5.5 km	MPC · JPL
40727	1999 SQ_{11}	—	September 30, 1999	Catalina	CSS	NEM	6.5 km	MPC · JPL
40728	1999 SS_{11}	—	September 30, 1999	Catalina	CSS	·	3.8 km	MPC · JPL
40729	1999 SJ_{12}	—	September 30, 1999	Socorro	LINEAR	PHO	3.9 km	MPC · JPL
40730	1999 SY_{12}	—	September 30, 1999	Socorro	LINEAR	·	10 km	MPC · JPL
40731	1999 SB_{13}	—	September 30, 1999	Socorro	LINEAR	MAR	3.8 km	MPC · JPL
40732	1999 SC_{13}	—	September 30, 1999	Socorro	LINEAR	·	13 km	MPC · JPL
40733	1999 SM_{17}	—	September 30, 1999	Socorro	LINEAR	·	2.8 km	MPC · JPL
40734	1999 SB_{19}	—	September 30, 1999	Socorro	LINEAR	EUP	10 km	MPC · JPL
40735	1999 SU_{19}	—	September 30, 1999	Socorro	LINEAR	·	4.1 km	MPC · JPL
40736	1999 SD_{20}	—	September 30, 1999	Socorro	LINEAR	EUN	6.4 km	MPC · JPL
40737	1999 SE_{20}	—	September 30, 1999	Socorro	LINEAR	·	3.6 km	MPC · JPL
40738	1999 SG_{20}	—	September 30, 1999	Socorro	LINEAR	·	8.9 km	MPC · JPL
40739	1999 SX_{25}	—	September 30, 1999	Catalina	CSS	EUN	4.1 km	MPC · JPL
40740	1999 SF_{27}	—	September 30, 1999	Catalina	CSS	MAR	2.5 km	MPC · JPL
40741	1999 TD	—	October 1, 1999	High Point	D. K. Chesney	·	11 km	MPC · JPL
40742	1999 TK	—	October 2, 1999	Prescott	P. G. Comba	THM	6.7 km	MPC · JPL
40743	1999 TL	—	October 2, 1999	Prescott	P. G. Comba	THM	7.2 km	MPC · JPL
40744	1999 TG_{1}	—	October 1, 1999	Višnjan Observatory	K. Korlević	·	5.6 km	MPC · JPL
40745	1999 TN_{2}	—	October 2, 1999	Fountain Hills	C. W. Juels	EUN	4.2 km	MPC · JPL
40746	1999 TP_{2}	—	October 2, 1999	Fountain Hills	C. W. Juels	PHO	5.2 km	MPC · JPL
40747	1999 TK_{5}	—	October 2, 1999	High Point	D. K. Chesney	EUN	4.3 km	MPC · JPL
40748	1999 TO_{5}	—	October 1, 1999	Višnjan Observatory	K. Korlević, M. Jurić	·	3.7 km	MPC · JPL
40749	1999 TP_{6}	—	October 6, 1999	Višnjan Observatory	K. Korlević, M. Jurić	THM	9.0 km	MPC · JPL
40750	1999 TA_{7}	—	October 6, 1999	Višnjan Observatory	K. Korlević, M. Jurić	NYS	2.6 km	MPC · JPL
40751	1999 TD_{7}	—	October 6, 1999	Višnjan Observatory	K. Korlević, M. Jurić	·	8.2 km	MPC · JPL
40752	1999 TO_{7}	—	October 7, 1999	Višnjan Observatory	K. Korlević, M. Jurić	EUN · fast	5.1 km	MPC · JPL
40753	1999 TK_{8}	—	October 6, 1999	Višnjan Observatory	K. Korlević, M. Jurić	·	1.4 km	MPC · JPL
40754	1999 TM_{8}	—	October 6, 1999	Višnjan Observatory	K. Korlević, M. Jurić	KOR	3.2 km	MPC · JPL
40755	1999 TO_{8}	—	October 6, 1999	Višnjan Observatory	K. Korlević, M. Jurić	·	4.7 km	MPC · JPL
40756	1999 TQ_{8}	—	October 7, 1999	Višnjan Observatory	K. Korlević, M. Jurić	EOS	5.9 km	MPC · JPL
40757	1999 TS_{8}	—	October 5, 1999	Gekko	T. Kagawa	(5)	2.8 km	MPC · JPL
40758	1999 TT_{8}	—	October 5, 1999	Gekko	T. Kagawa	·	8.0 km	MPC · JPL
40759	1999 TY_{9}	—	October 6, 1999	Dossobuono	Lai, L.	slow	4.7 km	MPC · JPL
40760	1999 TH_{11}	—	October 9, 1999	Fountain Hills	C. W. Juels	·	15 km	MPC · JPL
40761	1999 TT_{13}	—	October 11, 1999	Črni Vrh	Mikuž, H.	·	6.3 km	MPC · JPL
40762	1999 TL_{14}	—	October 11, 1999	Višnjan Observatory	K. Korlević, M. Jurić	·	4.4 km	MPC · JPL
40763 Zloch	1999 TS_{14}	Zloch	October 5, 1999	Ondřejov	P. Kušnirák	·	5.0 km	MPC · JPL
40764 Gerhardiser	1999 TA_{16}	Gerhardiser	October 13, 1999	Starkenburg Observatory	Starkenburg	·	4.9 km	MPC · JPL
40765	1999 TF_{16}	—	October 10, 1999	Bédoin	P. Antonini	·	3.7 km	MPC · JPL
40766	1999 TB_{17}	—	October 14, 1999	Višnjan Observatory	K. Korlević	THM	9.6 km	MPC · JPL
40767	1999 TC_{17}	—	October 14, 1999	Višnjan Observatory	K. Korlević	·	8.8 km	MPC · JPL
40768	1999 TZ_{17}	—	October 10, 1999	Xinglong	SCAP	·	3.9 km	MPC · JPL
40769	1999 TJ_{18}	—	October 10, 1999	Xinglong	SCAP	·	10 km	MPC · JPL
40770	1999 TV_{18}	—	October 11, 1999	Črni Vrh	Mikuž, H.	·	10 km	MPC · JPL
40771	1999 TP_{19}	—	October 15, 1999	Farra d'Isonzo	Farra d'Isonzo	·	3.2 km	MPC · JPL
40772	1999 TY_{19}	—	October 14, 1999	Xinglong	SCAP	·	4.6 km	MPC · JPL
40773	1999 TZ_{19}	—	October 15, 1999	Xinglong	SCAP	·	2.7 km	MPC · JPL
40774 Iwaigame	1999 TH_{20}	Iwaigame	October 11, 1999	Nanyo	T. Okuni	·	6.8 km	MPC · JPL
40775 Kalafina	1999 TO_{20}	Kalafina	October 5, 1999	Goodricke-Pigott	R. A. Tucker	·	7.5 km	MPC · JPL
40776 Yeungkwongyu	1999 TA_{21}	Yeungkwongyu	October 7, 1999	Goodricke-Pigott	R. A. Tucker	·	6.0 km	MPC · JPL
40777	1999 TM_{25}	—	October 3, 1999	Socorro	LINEAR	·	3.6 km	MPC · JPL
40778	1999 TV_{25}	—	October 3, 1999	Socorro	LINEAR	·	4.4 km	MPC · JPL
40779	1999 TY_{25}	—	October 3, 1999	Socorro	LINEAR	·	5.0 km	MPC · JPL
40780	1999 TB_{26}	—	October 3, 1999	Socorro	LINEAR	MRX	3.3 km	MPC · JPL
40781	1999 TN_{26}	—	October 3, 1999	Socorro	LINEAR	(5)	5.0 km	MPC · JPL
40782	1999 TX_{26}	—	October 3, 1999	Socorro	LINEAR	KOR	3.5 km	MPC · JPL
40783	1999 TT_{28}	—	October 4, 1999	Socorro	LINEAR	KOR	2.8 km	MPC · JPL
40784	1999 TV_{28}	—	October 4, 1999	Socorro	LINEAR	·	4.5 km	MPC · JPL
40785	1999 TA_{29}	—	October 4, 1999	Socorro	LINEAR	·	3.8 km	MPC · JPL
40786	1999 TR_{30}	—	October 4, 1999	Socorro	LINEAR	·	3.3 km	MPC · JPL
40787	1999 TV_{30}	—	October 4, 1999	Socorro	LINEAR	EUN	5.1 km	MPC · JPL
40788	1999 TK_{31}	—	October 4, 1999	Socorro	LINEAR	HYG	7.2 km	MPC · JPL
40789	1999 TW_{31}	—	October 4, 1999	Socorro	LINEAR	KOR	3.4 km	MPC · JPL
40790	1999 TP_{32}	—	October 4, 1999	Socorro	LINEAR	·	2.3 km	MPC · JPL
40791	1999 TO_{33}	—	October 4, 1999	Socorro	LINEAR	·	3.0 km	MPC · JPL
40792	1999 TY_{33}	—	October 4, 1999	Socorro	LINEAR	KOR	2.8 km	MPC · JPL
40793	1999 TZ_{33}	—	October 4, 1999	Socorro	LINEAR	·	2.6 km	MPC · JPL
40794	1999 TD_{36}	—	October 2, 1999	Anderson Mesa	LONEOS	·	3.9 km	MPC · JPL
40795 Akiratsuchiyama	1999 TF_{36}	Akiratsuchiyama	October 5, 1999	Anderson Mesa	LONEOS	V	3.0 km	MPC · JPL
40796	1999 TT_{36}	—	October 13, 1999	Anderson Mesa	LONEOS	·	5.5 km	MPC · JPL
40797	1999 TM_{37}	—	October 15, 1999	Anderson Mesa	LONEOS	·	8.0 km	MPC · JPL
40798	1999 TV_{37}	—	October 1, 1999	Catalina	CSS	·	3.4 km	MPC · JPL
40799	1999 TW_{37}	—	October 1, 1999	Catalina	CSS	·	4.8 km	MPC · JPL
40800	1999 TD_{38}	—	October 1, 1999	Catalina	CSS	NYS	3.0 km	MPC · JPL

== 40801–40900 ==
back to top

Designation			Discovery			Properties		Ref
Permanent	Provisional	Named after	Date	Site	Discoverer(s)	Category	Diam.	Ref
40801	1999 TN_{38}	—	October 1, 1999	Catalina	CSS	·	4.6 km	MPC · JPL
40802	1999 TL_{39}	—	October 3, 1999	Catalina	CSS	·	1.9 km	MPC · JPL
40803	1999 TX_{39}	—	October 3, 1999	Catalina	CSS	ADE	8.8 km	MPC · JPL
40804	1999 TQ_{40}	—	October 5, 1999	Catalina	CSS	·	7.5 km	MPC · JPL
40805	1999 TW_{41}	—	October 3, 1999	Kitt Peak	Spacewatch	·	2.0 km	MPC · JPL
40806	1999 TX_{41}	—	October 3, 1999	Kitt Peak	Spacewatch	NYS	2.1 km	MPC · JPL
40807	1999 TQ_{48}	—	October 4, 1999	Kitt Peak	Spacewatch	·	2.9 km	MPC · JPL
40808	1999 TB_{53}	—	October 6, 1999	Kitt Peak	Spacewatch	·	5.0 km	MPC · JPL
40809	1999 TZ_{57}	—	October 6, 1999	Kitt Peak	Spacewatch	·	5.5 km	MPC · JPL
40810	1999 TK_{63}	—	October 7, 1999	Kitt Peak	Spacewatch	·	3.5 km	MPC · JPL
40811	1999 TL_{63}	—	October 7, 1999	Kitt Peak	Spacewatch	·	5.3 km	MPC · JPL
40812	1999 TV_{63}	—	October 7, 1999	Kitt Peak	Spacewatch	ANF	3.4 km	MPC · JPL
40813	1999 TJ_{66}	—	October 8, 1999	Kitt Peak	Spacewatch	·	5.4 km	MPC · JPL
40814	1999 TY_{69}	—	October 9, 1999	Kitt Peak	Spacewatch	KOR	3.0 km	MPC · JPL
40815	1999 TY_{77}	—	October 11, 1999	Kitt Peak	Spacewatch	·	3.6 km	MPC · JPL
40816	1999 TX_{78}	—	October 11, 1999	Kitt Peak	Spacewatch	·	5.4 km	MPC · JPL
40817	1999 TT_{79}	—	October 11, 1999	Kitt Peak	Spacewatch	·	6.7 km	MPC · JPL
40818	1999 TR_{80}	—	October 11, 1999	Kitt Peak	Spacewatch	NYS	1.5 km	MPC · JPL
40819	1999 TT_{80}	—	October 11, 1999	Kitt Peak	Spacewatch	KOR	3.5 km	MPC · JPL
40820	1999 TY_{89}	—	October 2, 1999	Socorro	LINEAR	KOR	3.4 km	MPC · JPL
40821	1999 TD_{90}	—	October 2, 1999	Socorro	LINEAR	·	3.4 km	MPC · JPL
40822	1999 TM_{90}	—	October 2, 1999	Socorro	LINEAR	·	3.7 km	MPC · JPL
40823	1999 TU_{90}	—	October 2, 1999	Socorro	LINEAR	ADE ·	3.9 km	MPC · JPL
40824	1999 TV_{90}	—	October 2, 1999	Socorro	LINEAR	·	5.8 km	MPC · JPL
40825	1999 TZ_{90}	—	October 2, 1999	Socorro	LINEAR	·	2.3 km	MPC · JPL
40826	1999 TP_{91}	—	October 2, 1999	Socorro	LINEAR	·	3.2 km	MPC · JPL
40827	1999 TT_{92}	—	October 2, 1999	Socorro	LINEAR	·	5.3 km	MPC · JPL
40828	1999 TM_{93}	—	October 2, 1999	Socorro	LINEAR	·	5.4 km	MPC · JPL
40829	1999 TT_{93}	—	October 2, 1999	Socorro	LINEAR	·	4.4 km	MPC · JPL
40830	1999 TV_{93}	—	October 2, 1999	Socorro	LINEAR	NYS ·	5.1 km	MPC · JPL
40831	1999 TU_{94}	—	October 2, 1999	Socorro	LINEAR	·	3.5 km	MPC · JPL
40832	1999 TH_{95}	—	October 2, 1999	Socorro	LINEAR	·	5.8 km	MPC · JPL
40833	1999 TJ_{95}	—	October 2, 1999	Socorro	LINEAR	·	5.5 km	MPC · JPL
40834	1999 TL_{95}	—	October 2, 1999	Socorro	LINEAR	·	3.7 km	MPC · JPL
40835	1999 TM_{95}	—	October 2, 1999	Socorro	LINEAR	·	5.1 km	MPC · JPL
40836	1999 TQ_{95}	—	October 2, 1999	Socorro	LINEAR	·	5.4 km	MPC · JPL
40837	1999 TX_{95}	—	October 2, 1999	Socorro	LINEAR	(17392)	4.0 km	MPC · JPL
40838	1999 TY_{95}	—	October 2, 1999	Socorro	LINEAR	MRX ·	5.9 km	MPC · JPL
40839	1999 TH_{96}	—	October 2, 1999	Socorro	LINEAR	AGN	3.0 km	MPC · JPL
40840	1999 TS_{96}	—	October 2, 1999	Socorro	LINEAR	EOS	6.4 km	MPC · JPL
40841	1999 TQ_{98}	—	October 2, 1999	Socorro	LINEAR	GEF	4.5 km	MPC · JPL
40842	1999 TX_{98}	—	October 2, 1999	Socorro	LINEAR	·	4.6 km	MPC · JPL
40843	1999 TD_{99}	—	October 2, 1999	Socorro	LINEAR	·	2.2 km	MPC · JPL
40844	1999 TS_{101}	—	October 2, 1999	Socorro	LINEAR	EUN	3.2 km	MPC · JPL
40845	1999 TL_{102}	—	October 2, 1999	Socorro	LINEAR	·	4.9 km	MPC · JPL
40846	1999 TN_{102}	—	October 2, 1999	Socorro	LINEAR	·	2.6 km	MPC · JPL
40847	1999 TU_{102}	—	October 2, 1999	Socorro	LINEAR	·	10 km	MPC · JPL
40848	1999 TZ_{102}	—	October 2, 1999	Socorro	LINEAR	·	4.3 km	MPC · JPL
40849	1999 TG_{103}	—	October 2, 1999	Socorro	LINEAR	·	3.5 km	MPC · JPL
40850	1999 TR_{104}	—	October 3, 1999	Socorro	LINEAR	EOS	4.7 km	MPC · JPL
40851	1999 TZ_{104}	—	October 3, 1999	Socorro	LINEAR	·	3.3 km	MPC · JPL
40852	1999 TX_{105}	—	October 3, 1999	Socorro	LINEAR	·	8.4 km	MPC · JPL
40853	1999 TA_{106}	—	October 4, 1999	Socorro	LINEAR	GAL	4.7 km	MPC · JPL
40854	1999 TU_{107}	—	October 4, 1999	Socorro	LINEAR	EUN	4.3 km	MPC · JPL
40855	1999 TG_{108}	—	October 4, 1999	Socorro	LINEAR	EOS	6.9 km	MPC · JPL
40856	1999 TP_{108}	—	October 4, 1999	Socorro	LINEAR	·	4.8 km	MPC · JPL
40857	1999 TP_{110}	—	October 4, 1999	Socorro	LINEAR	·	4.4 km	MPC · JPL
40858	1999 TR_{110}	—	October 4, 1999	Socorro	LINEAR	·	5.1 km	MPC · JPL
40859	1999 TX_{111}	—	October 4, 1999	Socorro	LINEAR	·	4.7 km	MPC · JPL
40860	1999 TQ_{113}	—	October 4, 1999	Socorro	LINEAR	AGN	3.1 km	MPC · JPL
40861	1999 TR_{113}	—	October 4, 1999	Socorro	LINEAR	·	4.6 km	MPC · JPL
40862	1999 TB_{114}	—	October 4, 1999	Socorro	LINEAR	·	7.4 km	MPC · JPL
40863	1999 TL_{115}	—	October 4, 1999	Socorro	LINEAR	·	3.1 km	MPC · JPL
40864	1999 TO_{115}	—	October 4, 1999	Socorro	LINEAR	EOS	6.2 km	MPC · JPL
40865	1999 TH_{116}	—	October 4, 1999	Socorro	LINEAR	·	4.2 km	MPC · JPL
40866	1999 TU_{117}	—	October 4, 1999	Socorro	LINEAR	·	3.9 km	MPC · JPL
40867	1999 TD_{118}	—	October 4, 1999	Socorro	LINEAR	(5)	3.4 km	MPC · JPL
40868	1999 TM_{118}	—	October 4, 1999	Socorro	LINEAR	·	3.3 km	MPC · JPL
40869	1999 TN_{118}	—	October 4, 1999	Socorro	LINEAR	slow	3.6 km	MPC · JPL
40870	1999 TQ_{119}	—	October 4, 1999	Socorro	LINEAR	·	4.8 km	MPC · JPL
40871	1999 TS_{120}	—	October 4, 1999	Socorro	LINEAR	·	3.8 km	MPC · JPL
40872	1999 TB_{121}	—	October 4, 1999	Socorro	LINEAR	THM · fast	8.1 km	MPC · JPL
40873	1999 TL_{121}	—	October 4, 1999	Socorro	LINEAR	·	4.7 km	MPC · JPL
40874	1999 TL_{122}	—	October 4, 1999	Socorro	LINEAR	NYS	1.8 km	MPC · JPL
40875	1999 TA_{123}	—	October 4, 1999	Socorro	LINEAR	·	3.0 km	MPC · JPL
40876	1999 TH_{123}	—	October 4, 1999	Socorro	LINEAR	AGN	2.6 km	MPC · JPL
40877	1999 TF_{124}	—	October 15, 1999	Socorro	LINEAR	·	4.2 km	MPC · JPL
40878	1999 TU_{124}	—	October 4, 1999	Socorro	LINEAR	·	3.2 km	MPC · JPL
40879	1999 TX_{124}	—	October 4, 1999	Socorro	LINEAR	V	2.0 km	MPC · JPL
40880	1999 TA_{125}	—	October 4, 1999	Socorro	LINEAR	·	5.0 km	MPC · JPL
40881	1999 TY_{125}	—	October 4, 1999	Socorro	LINEAR	·	2.4 km	MPC · JPL
40882	1999 TZ_{125}	—	October 4, 1999	Socorro	LINEAR	·	5.8 km	MPC · JPL
40883	1999 TB_{126}	—	October 4, 1999	Socorro	LINEAR	·	4.3 km	MPC · JPL
40884	1999 TC_{126}	—	October 4, 1999	Socorro	LINEAR	·	2.1 km	MPC · JPL
40885	1999 TS_{126}	—	October 4, 1999	Socorro	LINEAR	·	6.2 km	MPC · JPL
40886	1999 TE_{127}	—	October 4, 1999	Socorro	LINEAR	·	2.7 km	MPC · JPL
40887	1999 TG_{128}	—	October 4, 1999	Socorro	LINEAR	KOR	3.4 km	MPC · JPL
40888	1999 TW_{131}	—	October 6, 1999	Socorro	LINEAR	KOR	2.6 km	MPC · JPL
40889	1999 TY_{132}	—	October 6, 1999	Socorro	LINEAR	·	3.2 km	MPC · JPL
40890	1999 TE_{133}	—	October 6, 1999	Socorro	LINEAR	·	7.5 km	MPC · JPL
40891	1999 TH_{136}	—	October 6, 1999	Socorro	LINEAR	·	3.3 km	MPC · JPL
40892	1999 TY_{136}	—	October 6, 1999	Socorro	LINEAR	·	6.2 km	MPC · JPL
40893	1999 TL_{138}	—	October 6, 1999	Socorro	LINEAR	AGN · slow	3.4 km	MPC · JPL
40894	1999 TQ_{138}	—	October 6, 1999	Socorro	LINEAR	·	1.9 km	MPC · JPL
40895	1999 TZ_{140}	—	October 6, 1999	Socorro	LINEAR	·	4.2 km	MPC · JPL
40896	1999 TO_{141}	—	October 6, 1999	Socorro	LINEAR	(12739)	3.1 km	MPC · JPL
40897	1999 TG_{142}	—	October 7, 1999	Socorro	LINEAR	·	3.3 km	MPC · JPL
40898	1999 TP_{142}	—	October 7, 1999	Socorro	LINEAR	·	2.9 km	MPC · JPL
40899	1999 TR_{142}	—	October 7, 1999	Socorro	LINEAR	·	3.3 km	MPC · JPL
40900	1999 TV_{142}	—	October 7, 1999	Socorro	LINEAR	·	4.2 km	MPC · JPL

== 40901–41000 ==
back to top

Designation			Discovery			Properties		Ref
Permanent	Provisional	Named after	Date	Site	Discoverer(s)	Category	Diam.	Ref
40901	1999 TG_{143}	—	October 7, 1999	Socorro	LINEAR	·	8.4 km	MPC · JPL
40902	1999 TY_{143}	—	October 7, 1999	Socorro	LINEAR	slow	6.4 km	MPC · JPL
40903	1999 TB_{144}	—	October 7, 1999	Socorro	LINEAR	GEF	4.3 km	MPC · JPL
40904	1999 TC_{144}	—	October 7, 1999	Socorro	LINEAR	·	2.4 km	MPC · JPL
40905	1999 TE_{148}	—	October 7, 1999	Socorro	LINEAR	EOS	4.8 km	MPC · JPL
40906	1999 TN_{148}	—	October 7, 1999	Socorro	LINEAR	BRA	5.4 km	MPC · JPL
40907	1999 TF_{149}	—	October 7, 1999	Socorro	LINEAR	·	4.6 km	MPC · JPL
40908	1999 TW_{151}	—	October 7, 1999	Socorro	LINEAR	·	3.9 km	MPC · JPL
40909	1999 TR_{152}	—	October 7, 1999	Socorro	LINEAR	·	6.7 km	MPC · JPL
40910	1999 TS_{152}	—	October 7, 1999	Socorro	LINEAR	NYS	1.7 km	MPC · JPL
40911	1999 TU_{152}	—	October 7, 1999	Socorro	LINEAR	·	2.8 km	MPC · JPL
40912	1999 TX_{152}	—	October 7, 1999	Socorro	LINEAR	·	11 km	MPC · JPL
40913	1999 TZ_{152}	—	October 7, 1999	Socorro	LINEAR	·	2.1 km	MPC · JPL
40914	1999 TH_{155}	—	October 7, 1999	Socorro	LINEAR	·	4.8 km	MPC · JPL
40915	1999 TT_{155}	—	October 7, 1999	Socorro	LINEAR	PAD	6.4 km	MPC · JPL
40916	1999 TE_{156}	—	October 7, 1999	Socorro	LINEAR	EOS	6.0 km	MPC · JPL
40917 Pauljorden	1999 TW_{156}	Pauljorden	October 9, 1999	Socorro	LINEAR	HYG	7.1 km	MPC · JPL
40918	1999 TG_{158}	—	October 7, 1999	Socorro	LINEAR	EOS	4.5 km	MPC · JPL
40919 Johntonry	1999 TF_{162}	Johntonry	October 9, 1999	Socorro	LINEAR	·	2.5 km	MPC · JPL
40920	1999 TD_{171}	—	October 10, 1999	Socorro	LINEAR	KOR	3.5 km	MPC · JPL
40921	1999 TR_{171}	—	October 10, 1999	Socorro	LINEAR	KOR	3.5 km	MPC · JPL
40922	1999 TH_{172}	—	October 10, 1999	Socorro	LINEAR	PAD	6.1 km	MPC · JPL
40923	1999 TB_{173}	—	October 10, 1999	Socorro	LINEAR	EOS	5.5 km	MPC · JPL
40924	1999 TB_{174}	—	October 10, 1999	Socorro	LINEAR	EOS	5.2 km	MPC · JPL
40925	1999 TL_{174}	—	October 10, 1999	Socorro	LINEAR	·	2.1 km	MPC · JPL
40926	1999 TQ_{177}	—	October 10, 1999	Socorro	LINEAR	·	4.5 km	MPC · JPL
40927	1999 TZ_{185}	—	October 12, 1999	Socorro	LINEAR	ADE	7.1 km	MPC · JPL
40928	1999 TB_{187}	—	October 12, 1999	Socorro	LINEAR	·	5.9 km	MPC · JPL
40929	1999 TB_{188}	—	October 12, 1999	Socorro	LINEAR	·	4.8 km	MPC · JPL
40930	1999 TJ_{189}	—	October 12, 1999	Socorro	LINEAR	EOS	5.3 km	MPC · JPL
40931	1999 TX_{189}	—	October 12, 1999	Socorro	LINEAR	·	2.8 km	MPC · JPL
40932	1999 TF_{191}	—	October 12, 1999	Socorro	LINEAR	EOS	6.0 km	MPC · JPL
40933	1999 TP_{192}	—	October 12, 1999	Socorro	LINEAR	EOS	6.2 km	MPC · JPL
40934	1999 TJ_{194}	—	October 12, 1999	Socorro	LINEAR	GEF	4.9 km	MPC · JPL
40935	1999 TO_{195}	—	October 12, 1999	Socorro	LINEAR	·	7.5 km	MPC · JPL
40936	1999 TP_{200}	—	October 13, 1999	Socorro	LINEAR	·	1.9 km	MPC · JPL
40937	1999 TQ_{200}	—	October 13, 1999	Socorro	LINEAR	·	2.5 km	MPC · JPL
40938	1999 TO_{205}	—	October 13, 1999	Socorro	LINEAR	AGN	3.5 km	MPC · JPL
40939	1999 TU_{209}	—	October 14, 1999	Socorro	LINEAR	EOS	4.8 km	MPC · JPL
40940	1999 TZ_{209}	—	October 14, 1999	Socorro	LINEAR	EOS	7.7 km	MPC · JPL
40941	1999 TS_{211}	—	October 15, 1999	Socorro	LINEAR	·	5.4 km	MPC · JPL
40942	1999 TZ_{212}	—	October 15, 1999	Socorro	LINEAR	·	4.7 km	MPC · JPL
40943	1999 TT_{213}	—	October 15, 1999	Socorro	LINEAR	KOR	3.0 km	MPC · JPL
40944	1999 TJ_{216}	—	October 15, 1999	Socorro	LINEAR	KOR	3.8 km	MPC · JPL
40945	1999 TX_{216}	—	October 15, 1999	Socorro	LINEAR	·	7.0 km	MPC · JPL
40946	1999 TK_{217}	—	October 15, 1999	Socorro	LINEAR	·	2.8 km	MPC · JPL
40947	1999 TJ_{218}	—	October 15, 1999	Socorro	LINEAR	·	2.8 km	MPC · JPL
40948	1999 TH_{228}	—	October 2, 1999	Socorro	LINEAR	KOR ·	3.2 km	MPC · JPL
40949	1999 TQ_{228}	—	October 2, 1999	Catalina	CSS	·	5.9 km	MPC · JPL
40950	1999 TQ_{229}	—	October 5, 1999	Catalina	CSS	·	8.0 km	MPC · JPL
40951	1999 TO_{230}	—	October 4, 1999	Anderson Mesa	LONEOS	·	4.3 km	MPC · JPL
40952	1999 TD_{231}	—	October 5, 1999	Catalina	CSS	PAD	4.9 km	MPC · JPL
40953	1999 TB_{237}	—	October 3, 1999	Catalina	CSS	·	2.3 km	MPC · JPL
40954	1999 TQ_{238}	—	October 4, 1999	Catalina	CSS	·	5.7 km	MPC · JPL
40955	1999 TQ_{241}	—	October 4, 1999	Catalina	CSS	DOR · slow	8.4 km	MPC · JPL
40956 Ericamsel	1999 TZ_{241}	Ericamsel	October 4, 1999	Catalina	CSS	·	6.2 km	MPC · JPL
40957	1999 TR_{242}	—	October 4, 1999	Catalina	CSS	EOS	5.5 km	MPC · JPL
40958	1999 TV_{242}	—	October 4, 1999	Catalina	CSS	·	3.1 km	MPC · JPL
40959	1999 TB_{243}	—	October 4, 1999	Anderson Mesa	LONEOS	·	10 km	MPC · JPL
40960	1999 TL_{244}	—	October 7, 1999	Catalina	CSS	KOR	3.3 km	MPC · JPL
40961	1999 TV_{247}	—	October 8, 1999	Catalina	CSS	·	5.0 km	MPC · JPL
40962	1999 TW_{247}	—	October 8, 1999	Catalina	CSS	(1298)	9.9 km	MPC · JPL
40963	1999 TZ_{247}	—	October 8, 1999	Catalina	CSS	·	11 km	MPC · JPL
40964	1999 TE_{248}	—	October 8, 1999	Catalina	CSS	·	8.3 km	MPC · JPL
40965	1999 TH_{249}	—	October 9, 1999	Catalina	CSS	·	3.1 km	MPC · JPL
40966	1999 TM_{250}	—	October 9, 1999	Catalina	CSS	·	5.8 km	MPC · JPL
40967	1999 TC_{251}	—	October 5, 1999	Socorro	LINEAR	·	9.1 km	MPC · JPL
40968	1999 TO_{254}	—	October 8, 1999	Socorro	LINEAR	·	3.7 km	MPC · JPL
40969	1999 TR_{258}	—	October 9, 1999	Socorro	LINEAR	·	3.1 km	MPC · JPL
40970	1999 TK_{261}	—	October 14, 1999	Anderson Mesa	LONEOS	·	8.0 km	MPC · JPL
40971	1999 TY_{264}	—	October 3, 1999	Socorro	LINEAR	HNS	3.6 km	MPC · JPL
40972	1999 TL_{267}	—	October 3, 1999	Socorro	LINEAR	·	8.4 km	MPC · JPL
40973	1999 TL_{269}	—	October 3, 1999	Socorro	LINEAR	EOS	3.8 km	MPC · JPL
40974	1999 TS_{269}	—	October 3, 1999	Socorro	LINEAR	·	7.5 km	MPC · JPL
40975	1999 TU_{269}	—	October 3, 1999	Socorro	LINEAR	·	4.6 km	MPC · JPL
40976	1999 TV_{272}	—	October 3, 1999	Socorro	LINEAR	LIX	12 km	MPC · JPL
40977	1999 TD_{279}	—	October 7, 1999	Socorro	LINEAR	EOS	4.1 km	MPC · JPL
40978	1999 TN_{279}	—	October 7, 1999	Socorro	LINEAR	HNS	2.7 km	MPC · JPL
40979	1999 TL_{280}	—	October 8, 1999	Socorro	LINEAR	·	3.1 km	MPC · JPL
40980	1999 TO_{282}	—	October 9, 1999	Socorro	LINEAR	·	3.9 km	MPC · JPL
40981 Stephenholland	1999 TL_{284}	Stephenholland	October 9, 1999	Socorro	LINEAR	·	5.1 km	MPC · JPL
40982	1999 TR_{285}	—	October 10, 1999	Socorro	LINEAR	·	4.3 km	MPC · JPL
40983	1999 TB_{286}	—	October 10, 1999	Socorro	LINEAR	·	2.9 km	MPC · JPL
40984	1999 TL_{288}	—	October 10, 1999	Socorro	LINEAR	EOS	4.7 km	MPC · JPL
40985	1999 TM_{288}	—	October 10, 1999	Socorro	LINEAR	THM	8.0 km	MPC · JPL
40986	1999 TY_{292}	—	October 12, 1999	Socorro	LINEAR	·	3.6 km	MPC · JPL
40987	1999 TJ_{293}	—	October 12, 1999	Socorro	LINEAR	EOS	4.7 km	MPC · JPL
40988	1999 TN_{311}	—	October 7, 1999	Catalina	CSS	·	6.4 km	MPC · JPL
40989	1999 UO	—	October 16, 1999	Višnjan Observatory	K. Korlević	EOS	3.9 km	MPC · JPL
40990	1999 UW	—	October 16, 1999	Višnjan Observatory	K. Korlević	·	3.4 km	MPC · JPL
40991	1999 UA_{1}	—	October 16, 1999	Višnjan Observatory	K. Korlević	·	2.1 km	MPC · JPL
40992	1999 UL_{1}	—	October 18, 1999	High Point	D. K. Chesney	·	7.6 km	MPC · JPL
40993	1999 UF_{2}	—	October 16, 1999	Višnjan Observatory	K. Korlević	·	3.3 km	MPC · JPL
40994 Tekaridake	1999 UZ_{2}	Tekaridake	October 20, 1999	Mishima	M. Akiyama	EUN · slow	4.6 km	MPC · JPL
40995 Mühleis	1999 UC_{4}	Mühleis	October 27, 1999	Starkenburg Observatory	Starkenburg	·	2.6 km	MPC · JPL
40996	1999 UO_{5}	—	October 28, 1999	Catalina	CSS	MAR	3.4 km	MPC · JPL
40997	1999 UE_{6}	—	October 27, 1999	Xinglong	SCAP	·	4.2 km	MPC · JPL
40998	1999 US_{7}	—	October 29, 1999	Catalina	CSS	·	9.3 km	MPC · JPL
40999	1999 UU_{8}	—	October 29, 1999	Catalina	CSS	·	4.9 km	MPC · JPL
41000 Aomawa	1999 UB_{9}	Aomawa	October 29, 1999	Catalina	CSS	HOF	7.4 km	MPC · JPL

back to top

== See also ==
- Meanings of minor-planet names: 40001–41000
