= Zloch =

Zloch or Złoch is a surname of Czech and Polish-language origin. It may refer to:

- František Zloch (born 1949), Czech solar observer
- Paul Zorner (born Paul Zloch, 1920–2014), German fighter pilot
- William J. Zloch (born 1944), American judge
