= Audrey C. Delsanti =

French astronomer (born 1976)

Minor planets discovered: 2
| (40314) 1999 KR16 | 16 May 1999 | MPC^{[A]} |
| (123509) 2000 WK_{183} | 26 November 2000 | MPC^{[A]}^{[B]} |
^{A} with O. R. Hainaut^{B} with C. E. Delahodde

Audrey Delsanti (French: [odʁɛ dɛlsɑ̃ti]; born 27 August 1976) is a French astronomer and a discoverer of minor planets at ESO's La Silla Observatory in Chile.

The Minor Planet Center credits her with the discovery of two numbered minor planets, but erroneously gives the credit to "A. Dalsanti" for the trans-Neptunian object (40314) 1999 KR16, which she co-discovered in 1999.

In 2004, she was awarded a NASA Postdoctoral Fellowship in astrobiology at the Institute for Astronomy of the University of Hawaii in Honolulu.
