= Meanings of minor-planet names: 40001–41000 =

As minor planet discoveries are confirmed, they are given a permanent number by the IAU's Minor Planet Center (MPC), and the discoverers can then submit names for them, following the IAU's naming conventions. The list below concerns those minor planets in the specified number-range that have received names, and explains the meanings of those names.

Official naming citations of newly named small Solar System bodies are approved and published in a bulletin by IAU's Working Group for Small Bodies Nomenclature (WGSBN). Before May 2021, citations were published in MPC's Minor Planet Circulars for many decades. Recent citations can also be found on the JPL Small-Body Database (SBDB). Until his death in 2016, German astronomer Lutz D. Schmadel compiled these citations into the Dictionary of Minor Planet Names (DMP) and regularly updated the collection.

Based on Paul Herget's The Names of the Minor Planets, Schmadel also researched the unclear origin of numerous asteroids, most of which had been named prior to World War II. This article incorporates text from this source, which is in the public domain: SBDB New namings may only be added to this list below after official publication as the preannouncement of names is condemned. The WGSBN publishes a comprehensive guideline for the naming rules of non-cometary small Solar System bodies.

== 40001–40100 ==
Named minor planet	Provisional	This minor planet was named for...	Ref · Catalog
40007 Vieuxtemps	1998 HV_{102}	Henri Vieuxtemps (1820–1881), a Belgian composer and violist	JPL · 40007
40023 ANPCEN	1998 HU_{148}	The National Association for the Protection of the Sky and Nightly Environments in France (ANPCEN) was established in March 1999. Presently 581 communities have joined the association. Recently Strasbourg, a city of 300,000 inhabitants, has signed the association's charter.	JPL · 40023
40081 Rault	1998 MG_{14}	Jean Louis Rault (born 1949) is a French amateur radio astronomer who was president of the radioastronomy commission of the Société Astronomique de France from 2008 to 2019. He is responsible for the radio part of the Vigie-Ciel network, which detects the echoes of the GRAVES space surveillance radar.	IAU · 40081
40092 Memel	1998 ME_{47}	Neman or Memel River, whose Couronian-Latvian name means silent	JPL · 40092

== 40101–40200 ==
back to top

Named minor planet	Provisional	This minor planet was named for...	Ref · Catalog
40104 Stevekerr	1998 QE_{4}	Australian amateur astronomer Steve Kerr.	IAU · 40104
40106 Erben	1998 QW_{5}	Karel Jaromír Erben (1811–1870), Czech author, poet, and collector of folk songs, rhymes and fairy tales	JPL · 40106
40134 Marsili	1998 QO_{53}	The Marsili undersea volcano located in the Tyrrhenian Sea, south of Naples, Italy. It is Europe's highest and largest submarine volcano.	JPL · 40134
40198 Azarkhalatbari	1998 SA_{1}	Azar Khalatbari (1961–2022) was a French-Iranian science writer who obtained a PhD in geophysics and a Master's degree in the history of science. She specialized in physics, astrophysics, earth sciences and mathematics. Her articles and books helped make these disciplines readily accessible to wide audiences.	IAU · 40198

== 40201–40300 ==
back to top

Named minor planet	Provisional	This minor planet was named for...	Ref · Catalog
40201 Besely	1998 SO_{13}	Besely is the name of the first astronomical observatory in Madagascar.	IAU · 40201
40206 Lhenice	1998 SB_{36}	Lhenice, South Bohemia, Czech market town †	MPC · 40206
40209 Morrispodolak	1998 SU_{55}	Morris Podolak (born 1949) is a professor of planetary sciences at Tel-Aviv University whose long career includes studying giant planet formation, protostellar discs, and the structure and evolution of comets.	IAU · 40209
40210 Peixinho	1998 SL_{56}	Nuno Peixinho (born 1971) from the University of Coimbra (Portugal) is a planetary scientist who studies the chemical composition of small bodies across the Solar System.	IAU · 40210
40227 Tahiti	1998 SR_{145}	Tahiti, the largest island in French Polynesia, where the British astronomer Charles Green observed the 1769 transit of Venus	JPL · 40227
40230 Rožmberk	1998 TJ_{6}	Rožmberkové (The Rosenbergs), one of the most significant Bohemian noble families	JPL · 40230
40233 Baradeau	1998 UH_{2}	Patrick Baradeau (born 1952) is a French historian and publisher. He worked with the Ministry of National Education and he was president and secretary general of the Société astronomique de France from 2014 to 2021. He was also the Director of the publication of the magazine l'Astronomie.	IAU · 40233
40241 Deienno	1998 VA_{46}	Rogerio Deienno (b. 1983), a Brazilian astronomer.	IAU · 40241
40248 Yukikajiura	1998 XF_{5}	Yuki Kajiura (born 1965) is a Japanese composer and musical producer. She has composed the soundtrack music for many anime films and has formed the musical groups FictionJunction and Kalafina.	JPL · 40248

== 40301–40400 ==
back to top

Named minor planet	Provisional	This minor planet was named for...	Ref · Catalog
40328 Dow	1999 MK	Marjorie Dow Healy (1906–2000), mother of David Healy who discovered this minor planet	MPC · 40328

== 40401–40500 ==
back to top

Named minor planet	Provisional	This minor planet was named for...	Ref · Catalog
40409 Taichikato	1999 RS_{2}	Taichi Kato (born 1961), Japanese astronomer	JPL · 40409
40410 Příhoda	1999 RJ_{3}	Pavel Příhoda (born 1934), Czech author and astronomy popularizer, editor-in-chief of The Czech Astronomical Yearbook	JPL · 40410
40436 Sylviecoyaud	1999 RQ_{32}	Sylvie Coyaud, a French-Italian scientific reporter and amateur astronomer	JPL · 40436
40440 Dobrovský	1999 RU_{34}	Josef Dobrovský (1753–1829), a Czech linguist, who codified the rules of the written Czech language	JPL · 40440
40441 Jungmann	1999 RW_{34}	Josef Jungmann (1773–1847), Czech poet, publicist and literary historian, author of the Czech-German Dictionary	JPL · 40441
40444 Palacký	1999 RV_{35}	František Palacký (1798–1876), Czech historian and politician	JPL · 40444
40447 Lorenzoni	1999 RC_{37}	Giuseppe Lorenzoni (1843–1914), an Italian astronomer and scientist	JPL · 40447
40457 Williamkuhn	1999 RG_{43}	William Kuhn (1918–2003), American amateur astronomer, designer of the Orange County Astronomers 57 cm Kuhn telescope at Anza, California Src	MPC · 40457
40459 Rektorys	1999 RK_{43}	Karel Rektorys (born 1923), Czech mathematician and professor at the Czech Technical University in Prague	JPL · 40459
40463 Frankkameny	1999 RE_{44}	Frank Kameny (1925–2011), American astronomer in the 1950s	JPL · 40463

== 40501–40600 ==
back to top

Named minor planet	Provisional	This minor planet was named for...	Ref · Catalog
There are no named minor planets in this number range

== 40601–40700 ==
back to top

Named minor planet	Provisional	This minor planet was named for...	Ref · Catalog
40684 Vanhoeck	1999 RE_{214}	Luc Vanhoeck (1959–2005), Belgian amateur astronomer and pioneer of digital astrophotography	JPL · 40684

== 40701–40800 ==
back to top

Named minor planet	Provisional	This minor planet was named for...	Ref · Catalog
40706 Milam	1999 RO_{240}	Stefanie N. Milam (born 1980) is an astrochemist at NASA Goddard Space Flight Center. Her expertise ranges across the electromagnetic spectrum and from interstellar ices to evolved stars to solar system objects. She is Deputy Project Scientist for Planetary Science for the James Webb Space Telescope.	IAU · 40706
40763 Zloch	1999 TS_{14}	František Zloch (born 1949) is a retired solar observer of the Czech Academy of Sciences in Ondřejov. He conducted systematic observations of solar activity from 1981 to 2011, which were used by the International Patrol Service. He was also the founder and first director of the Rimavská Sobota Observatory (1975–1981).	JPL · 40763
40764 Gerhardiser	1999 TA_{16}	Gerhard Iser (born 1962), German amateur astronomer and mentor of one of the discoverers	JPL · 40764
40774 Iwaigame	1999 TH_{20}	Iwaigame Mountain, located in the southern part of the Asahi mountain range.	JPL · 40774
40775 Kalafina	1999 TO_{20}	Kalafina, a Japanese vocal group formed in 2007 by composer Yuki Kajiura to produce the soundtrack music for the anime "Kara no Kyoukai", also known in English as "The Garden of Sinners". Their popularity has grown and they are now a neoclassical pop group presenting frequent concerts in Japan and internationally.	JPL · 40775
40776 Yeungkwongyu	1999 TA_{21}	William Kwong Yu Yeung (born 1960), a Canadian amateur astronomer and one of the world's most prolific amateur discoverers of minor planets and comets. He has also found J002E3, believed to be the Apollo 12 S-IVB stage.	JPL · 40776
40795 Akiratsuchiyama	1999 TF_{36}	Akira Tsuchiyama (born 1954) is a professor at Ritsumeikan University (Japan) and leader of the Itokawa sample analysis for the Hayabusa spacecraft mission. He specializes in studying primitive solar-system materials and is a pioneer for the three-dimensional study of materials using X-ray microtomography.	IAU · 40795

== 40801–40900 ==
back to top

Named minor planet	Provisional	This minor planet was named for...	Ref · Catalog
There are no named minor planets in this number range

== 40901–41000 ==
back to top

Named minor planet	Provisional	This minor planet was named for...	Ref · Catalog
40917 Pauljorden	1999 TW_{156}	Paul Jorden (born 1951) has a unique career that has included leadership positions in the scientific community (Royal Greenwich Observatory) and industry (e2v technologies). His teams have developed state-of-the-art imaging sensors and applied them to ground-based and space astronomy over a period of more than three decades.	JPL · 40917
40919 Johntonry	1999 TF_{162}	John Tonry (born 1953), of the University of Hawaii, has worked at the cutting edge of science and technology in astronomy. He developed the orthogonal transfer CCD concept, and a new method for extragalactic distance determinations, and was on the team that made the Nobel Prize winning discovery of dark energy.	JPL · 40919
40956 Ericamsel	1999 TZ_{241}	Eric Amsel (born 1956) is a Canadian-American psychologist and professor. He has mentored countless historically-disenfranchised students.	IAU · 40956
40981 Stephenholland	1999 TL_{284}	Stephen Holland (born 1956), of Lawrence Berkeley National Laboratory, is a pioneer in the development of silicon detectors for medical imaging, x-ray photon sciences, astronomy, and high-energy physics.	JPL · 40981
40994 Tekaridake	1999 UZ_{2}	Tekaridake, a mountain in the northern part of Shizuoka Prefecture, Japan	JPL · 40994
40995 Mühleis	1999 UC_{4}	Fritz Mühleis (1909–1984), German pharmacist and amateur astronomer who held doctoral degrees in philosophy and political science.	JPL · 40995
41000 Aomawa	1999 UB_{9}	Aomawa Shields, American astronomer, astrobiologist, mother, actor, and science communicator.	IAU · 41000

back to top

Preceded by 39,001–40,000	Meanings of minor-planet names List of minor planets: 40,001–41,000	Succeeded by 41,001–42,000
