= (40314) 1999 KR16 =

Trans-Neptunian object

(40314) 1999 KR_{16}
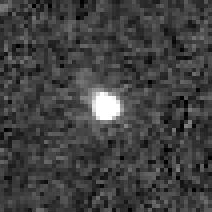
- Hubble Space Telescope image of 1999 KR_{16} taken in 2010

Discovery
- Discovered by: A. Dalsanti; O. R. Hainaut
- Discovery site: La Silla Obs.
- Discovery date: 16 May 1999

Designations
- Minor planet category: TNO · other · distant

Orbital characteristics
- Epoch 23 March 2018 (JD 2458200.5)
- Uncertainty parameter 2
- Observation arc: 16.09 yr (5,878 d)
- Aphelion: 64.604 AU
- Perihelion: 33.968 AU
- Semi-major axis: 49.286 AU
- Eccentricity: 0.3108
- Orbital period (sidereal): 346.02 yr (126,383 d)
- Mean anomaly: 347.77°
- Mean motion: 0° 0^{m} 10.08^{s} / day
- Inclination: 24.771°
- Longitude of ascending node: 205.57°
- Time of perihelion: ≈ 26 February 2030
- Argument of perihelion: 58.419°

Physical characteristics
- Mean diameter: 254±37 km 255 km (est.)
- Synodic rotation period: 5.8 h (half period?); 11.7 h
- Geometric albedo: 0.204±0.070
- Spectral type: RR (very red)
- Absolute magnitude (H): 5.5; 5.527±0.039 (R); 5.7; 5.59±0.02 (R)

(40314) 1999 KR_{16} is a trans-Neptunian object on an eccentric orbit in the outermost region of the Solar System, approximately 254 kilometers (158 miles) in diameter. It was discovered on 16 May 1999 by French astronomer Audrey Delsanti and Oliver Hainaut at ESO's La Silla Observatory in northern Chile. The very reddish object has a rotation period of 11.7 hours.

== Orbit and classification ==
The minor planet orbits the Sun at a distance between 34 and 65 AU once every 346 years (126,383 days; semi-major axis of 49.29 AU). Its orbit has an eccentricity of 0.31 and an inclination at an angle of 25° relative to the ecliptic.

== Numbering and naming ==
This minor planet was numbered by the Minor Planet Center on 26 May 2002. As of 2025, it has not been named.

== Physical characteristics ==
1999 KR_{16} has two solutions for its rotation period of 6 and 12 hours, respectively, and an albedo of 0.20.
