= Catherine E. Delahodde =

French astronomer

- Born: 1974 (age 51–52)
- Education: Aix-Marseille University
- Occupation: Astronomer
- Known for: Co-discovered a double trans-Neptunian object

Catherine E. Delahodde (born 1974) is a French astronomer and co-discoverer of a double trans-Neptunian object.

== Biography ==
Catherine Delahodde was born to a pharmacist mother and an electronics engineer father. She earned her DEA in astronomy in Nice, France, and then went to Chile for an internship at the European Southern Observatory (ESO), specifically the La Silla observatory, which is located on the outskirts of the Chilean Atacama Desert in the Andes.

While there, in 2000, she co-discovered the double trans-Neptunian object 123509 2000 WK _{183}.

The asteroid 15008 Delahodde is named in her honor.

In 2003, she defended her doctoral thesis on the physical properties of cometary nuclei: new observational perspectives at the Aix-Marseille University.

She worked for the Laboratoire d'astrophysique in Marseille, France, then at the University of Central Florida in Orlando. She left the world of research and became a consultant in information technology.
