= 40463 Frankkameny =

Main-belt asteroid

Discovery
- Discovered by: G. W. Billings
- Discovery site: Calgary Obs. (681)
- Discovery date: 15 September 1999

Designations
- Named after: Frank Kameny (gay rights activist)
- Alternative designations: 1999 RE_{44} · 1997 EJ_{19}
- Minor planet category: main-belt · (middle) background

Orbital characteristics
- Epoch 4 September 2017 (JD 2458000.5)
- Uncertainty parameter 0
- Observation arc: 19.17 yr (7,002 days)
- Aphelion: 3.2810 AU
- Perihelion: 2.2761 AU
- Semi-major axis: 2.7786 AU
- Eccentricity: 0.1808
- Orbital period (sidereal): 4.63 yr (1,692 days)
- Mean anomaly: 338.05°
- Mean motion: 0° 12^{m} 46.08^{s} / day
- Inclination: 2.4415°
- Longitude of ascending node: 302.75°
- Argument of perihelion: 32.248°

Physical characteristics
- Mean diameter: 3.855±0.638 km 4.23 km (calculated)
- Synodic rotation period: 56.5554±0.2034 h
- Geometric albedo: 0.057 (assumed); 0.075±0.028
- Spectral type: C
- Absolute magnitude (H): 15.147±0.004 (R) · 15.2 · 15.38±0.05 · 15.5 · 15.6

40463 Frankkameny (provisional designation 1999 RE_{44}) is a carbonaceous background asteroid from the central region of the asteroid belt, approximately 4 kilometers in diameter. It was discovered on 15 September 1999, by Canadian amateur astronomer Gary Billings at Calgary Observatory (681) in Alberta, Canada. The asteroid was named after American activist Frank Kameny.

== Orbit and classification ==
Frankkameny is a non-family from the main belt's background population. It orbits the Sun in the central asteroid belt at a distance of 2.3–3.3 AU once every 4 years and 8 months (1,692 days). Its orbit has an eccentricity of 0.18 and an inclination of 2° with respect to the ecliptic. Frankkameny was first identified as 1997 EJ_{19} by Spacewatch in 1997, extending the asteroid's observation arc by more than 2 years prior to its discovery observation.

== Physical characteristics ==
Frankkameny has been characterized as a carbonaceous C-type asteroid by Pan-STARRS photometric survey.

=== Rotation period ===
It has a rotation period of 56.6 hours with a brightness variation of 0.51 magnitude, based on a lightcurve obtained in September 2013, from photometric observations made at the Palomar Transient Factory, California (U=2). While not being a slow rotator, Frankkameny's period is far longer than average, and its brightness amplitude is indicative of a non-spheroidal shape.

=== Diameter and albedo ===
According to the survey carried out by NASA's Wide-field Infrared Survey Explorer with its subsequent NEOWISE mission, Frankkameny measures 3.9 kilometers in diameter and its surface has an albedo of 0.075, while the Collaborative Asteroid Lightcurve Link assumes a standard albedo for carbonaceous asteroids of 0.057 and calculates a diameter of 4.2 kilometers.

== Naming ==
This minor planet was named in honour of American astronomer and gay rights activist Frank Kameny (1925–2011), by the Minor Planet Center and the International Astronomical Union on 3 July 2012. Frank Kameny was a Harvard-trained variable star astronomer. He died 11 October 2011. The approved naming citation was published by the Minor Planet Center on 3 July 2012 (M.P.C. 79911).
