= List of minor planets: 684001–685000 =

The following is a partial list of minor planets, running from minor-planet number 684001 through 685000, inclusive. The primary data for this and other partial lists is based on JPL's "Small-Body Orbital Elements" and data available from the Minor Planet Center. Critical list information is also provided by the MPC, unless otherwise specified from Lowell Observatory. A detailed description of the table's columns and additional sources are given on the main page including a complete list of every page in this series, and a statistical break-up on the dynamical classification of minor planets.

Also see the summary list of all named bodies in numerical and alphabetical order, and the corresponding naming citations for the number range of this particular list. New namings may only be added to this list after official publication, as the preannouncement of names is condemned by the Working Group for Small Bodies Nomenclature of the International Astronomical Union.

Near-Earth obj.	MBA (inner)	MBA (outer)	Centaur
Mars-crosser	MBA (middle)	Jupiter trojan	Trans-Neptunian obj.
Unclassified

== 684001–684100 ==
Designation			Discovery			Properties		Ref
Permanent	Provisional	Named after	Date	Site	Discoverer(s)	Category	Diam.	Ref
684001	2008 GE_{121}	—	April 13, 2008	Kitt Peak	Spacewatch	·	1.7 km	MPC · JPL
684002	2008 GB_{124}	—	April 4, 2003	Kitt Peak	Spacewatch	·	2.1 km	MPC · JPL
684003	2008 GN_{125}	—	March 20, 1999	Apache Point	SDSS	·	1.2 km	MPC · JPL
684004	2008 GW_{126}	—	April 14, 2008	Mount Lemmon	Mount Lemmon Survey	·	2.6 km	MPC · JPL
684005	2008 GP_{138}	—	April 5, 2008	Mount Lemmon	Mount Lemmon Survey	·	1.4 km	MPC · JPL
684006	2008 GY_{138}	—	April 7, 2008	Mount Lemmon	Mount Lemmon Survey	·	1.7 km	MPC · JPL
684007	2008 GN_{150}	—	April 4, 2008	Catalina	CSS	·	1.4 km	MPC · JPL
684008	2008 GW_{150}	—	April 6, 2008	Kitt Peak	Spacewatch	·	1.8 km	MPC · JPL
684009	2008 GM_{152}	—	April 12, 2008	Kitt Peak	Spacewatch	·	1.4 km	MPC · JPL
684010	2008 GJ_{153}	—	December 10, 2006	Kitt Peak	Spacewatch	PHO	980 m	MPC · JPL
684011	2008 GZ_{154}	—	February 17, 2013	Mount Lemmon	Mount Lemmon Survey	EOS	1.5 km	MPC · JPL
684012	2008 GA_{155}	—	April 14, 2008	Mount Lemmon	Mount Lemmon Survey	·	490 m	MPC · JPL
684013	2008 GG_{155}	—	March 3, 2016	Mount Lemmon	Mount Lemmon Survey	H	360 m	MPC · JPL
684014	2008 GT_{158}	—	September 15, 2010	Mount Lemmon	Mount Lemmon Survey	EOS	1.4 km	MPC · JPL
684015	2008 GY_{158}	—	November 12, 2006	Mount Lemmon	Mount Lemmon Survey	·	1.0 km	MPC · JPL
684016	2008 GE_{160}	—	April 8, 2008	Mount Lemmon	Mount Lemmon Survey	·	1.3 km	MPC · JPL
684017	2008 GU_{162}	—	July 28, 2014	Haleakala	Pan-STARRS 1	·	1.4 km	MPC · JPL
684018	2008 GS_{163}	—	May 21, 2014	Haleakala	Pan-STARRS 1	EOS	1.4 km	MPC · JPL
684019	2008 GY_{163}	—	November 23, 2016	Mount Lemmon	Mount Lemmon Survey	·	1.3 km	MPC · JPL
684020	2008 GZ_{163}	—	November 2, 2011	Kitt Peak	Spacewatch	·	1.7 km	MPC · JPL
684021	2008 GN_{164}	—	September 29, 2010	Mount Lemmon	Mount Lemmon Survey	EOS	1.3 km	MPC · JPL
684022	2008 GP_{164}	—	April 15, 2008	Mount Lemmon	Mount Lemmon Survey	·	2.0 km	MPC · JPL
684023	2008 GU_{164}	—	January 27, 2012	Mount Lemmon	Mount Lemmon Survey	EOS	1.6 km	MPC · JPL
684024	2008 GP_{165}	—	October 19, 2016	Mount Lemmon	Mount Lemmon Survey	·	1.4 km	MPC · JPL
684025	2008 GX_{165}	—	November 2, 2010	Mount Lemmon	Mount Lemmon Survey	·	1.6 km	MPC · JPL
684026	2008 GZ_{165}	—	April 3, 2008	Kitt Peak	Spacewatch	·	1.0 km	MPC · JPL
684027	2008 GF_{166}	—	March 26, 2017	Mount Lemmon	Mount Lemmon Survey	·	1.2 km	MPC · JPL
684028	2008 GS_{166}	—	March 10, 2016	Haleakala	Pan-STARRS 1	·	810 m	MPC · JPL
684029	2008 GA_{168}	—	April 6, 2008	Mount Lemmon	Mount Lemmon Survey	·	2.3 km	MPC · JPL
684030	2008 GC_{168}	—	April 6, 2008	Mount Lemmon	Mount Lemmon Survey	·	2.1 km	MPC · JPL
684031	2008 GN_{168}	—	April 3, 2008	Mount Lemmon	Mount Lemmon Survey	L5	7.7 km	MPC · JPL
684032	2008 GO_{168}	—	April 6, 2008	Kitt Peak	Spacewatch	·	1.1 km	MPC · JPL
684033	2008 GQ_{168}	—	April 6, 2008	Kitt Peak	Spacewatch	·	920 m	MPC · JPL
684034	2008 GY_{168}	—	April 8, 2008	Kitt Peak	Spacewatch	·	720 m	MPC · JPL
684035	2008 GG_{169}	—	April 7, 2008	Kitt Peak	Spacewatch	V	500 m	MPC · JPL
684036	2008 GM_{169}	—	April 15, 2008	Mount Lemmon	Mount Lemmon Survey	·	2.0 km	MPC · JPL
684037	2008 GZ_{169}	—	April 11, 2008	Mount Lemmon	Mount Lemmon Survey	EOS	1.5 km	MPC · JPL
684038	2008 GH_{170}	—	April 15, 2008	Mount Lemmon	Mount Lemmon Survey	·	1.7 km	MPC · JPL
684039	2008 GN_{171}	—	April 6, 2008	Kitt Peak	Spacewatch	KOR	1.2 km	MPC · JPL
684040	2008 GS_{172}	—	April 4, 2008	Kitt Peak	Spacewatch	·	440 m	MPC · JPL
684041	2008 GW_{175}	—	April 13, 2008	Mount Lemmon	Mount Lemmon Survey	EUP	2.7 km	MPC · JPL
684042	2008 GX_{175}	—	April 8, 2008	Mount Lemmon	Mount Lemmon Survey	·	1.3 km	MPC · JPL
684043	2008 GV_{176}	—	April 3, 2008	Kitt Peak	Spacewatch	·	970 m	MPC · JPL
684044	2008 GG_{180}	—	April 6, 2008	Kitt Peak	Spacewatch	·	1.7 km	MPC · JPL
684045	2008 GK_{180}	—	April 4, 2008	Kitt Peak	Spacewatch	BRG	810 m	MPC · JPL
684046	2008 HL_{5}	—	March 28, 2008	Mount Lemmon	Mount Lemmon Survey	·	730 m	MPC · JPL
684047	2008 HJ_{19}	—	April 9, 2008	Kitt Peak	Spacewatch	·	570 m	MPC · JPL
684048	2008 HO_{23}	—	November 30, 2005	Kitt Peak	Spacewatch	·	1.9 km	MPC · JPL
684049	2008 HB_{24}	—	January 27, 2007	Mount Lemmon	Mount Lemmon Survey	·	2.0 km	MPC · JPL
684050	2008 HJ_{24}	—	April 11, 2008	Mount Lemmon	Mount Lemmon Survey	·	2.0 km	MPC · JPL
684051	2008 HW_{24}	—	April 4, 2008	Kitt Peak	Spacewatch	EOS	1.6 km	MPC · JPL
684052	2008 HL_{25}	—	April 27, 2008	Mount Lemmon	Mount Lemmon Survey	·	2.2 km	MPC · JPL
684053	2008 HM_{30}	—	April 29, 2008	Mount Lemmon	Mount Lemmon Survey	·	2.2 km	MPC · JPL
684054	2008 HC_{32}	—	April 29, 2008	Mount Lemmon	Mount Lemmon Survey	·	920 m	MPC · JPL
684055	2008 HK_{33}	—	April 8, 2008	Kitt Peak	Spacewatch	·	700 m	MPC · JPL
684056	2008 HP_{40}	—	March 12, 2008	Kitt Peak	Spacewatch	·	1.8 km	MPC · JPL
684057	2008 HY_{42}	—	November 23, 2006	Kitt Peak	Spacewatch	·	1.4 km	MPC · JPL
684058	2008 HQ_{49}	—	April 29, 2008	Kitt Peak	Spacewatch	·	2.0 km	MPC · JPL
684059	2008 HC_{51}	—	April 29, 2008	Kitt Peak	Spacewatch	·	870 m	MPC · JPL
684060	2008 HQ_{53}	—	April 4, 2008	Kitt Peak	Spacewatch	·	2.0 km	MPC · JPL
684061	2008 HH_{54}	—	April 29, 2008	Kitt Peak	Spacewatch	·	2.5 km	MPC · JPL
684062	2008 HG_{59}	—	August 30, 2005	Kitt Peak	Spacewatch	·	900 m	MPC · JPL
684063	2008 HQ_{62}	—	December 21, 2006	Kitt Peak	L. H. Wasserman, M. W. Buie	EOS	1.6 km	MPC · JPL
684064	2008 HK_{63}	—	January 25, 2007	Kitt Peak	Spacewatch	·	1.8 km	MPC · JPL
684065	2008 HF_{69}	—	April 3, 2008	Mount Lemmon	Mount Lemmon Survey	EOS	1.8 km	MPC · JPL
684066	2008 HF_{72}	—	December 6, 2015	Mount Lemmon	Mount Lemmon Survey	·	1.6 km	MPC · JPL
684067	2008 HG_{72}	—	April 30, 2008	Mount Lemmon	Mount Lemmon Survey	·	1.7 km	MPC · JPL
684068	2008 HO_{72}	—	March 11, 2013	Mount Lemmon	Mount Lemmon Survey	·	1.8 km	MPC · JPL
684069	2008 HM_{73}	—	August 12, 2013	Haleakala	Pan-STARRS 1	·	1.2 km	MPC · JPL
684070	2008 HP_{73}	—	November 10, 2010	Catalina	CSS	·	810 m	MPC · JPL
684071	2008 HB_{74}	—	January 23, 2011	Mount Lemmon	Mount Lemmon Survey	·	1.2 km	MPC · JPL
684072	2008 HM_{74}	—	April 29, 2008	Mount Lemmon	Mount Lemmon Survey	·	1.8 km	MPC · JPL
684073	2008 HN_{74}	—	March 7, 2013	Mount Lemmon	Mount Lemmon Survey	·	1.8 km	MPC · JPL
684074	2008 HA_{77}	—	April 24, 2008	Mount Lemmon	Mount Lemmon Survey	·	2.5 km	MPC · JPL
684075	2008 HP_{77}	—	April 14, 2008	Mount Lemmon	Mount Lemmon Survey	·	2.5 km	MPC · JPL
684076	2008 HQ_{77}	—	April 27, 2008	Kitt Peak	Spacewatch	EOS	1.6 km	MPC · JPL
684077	2008 HG_{78}	—	April 24, 2008	Kitt Peak	Spacewatch	·	450 m	MPC · JPL
684078	2008 HY_{78}	—	April 29, 2008	Kitt Peak	Spacewatch	RAF	560 m	MPC · JPL
684079	2008 HM_{79}	—	April 29, 2008	Mount Lemmon	Mount Lemmon Survey	·	1.1 km	MPC · JPL
684080	2008 JK_{4}	—	July 3, 2005	Palomar	NEAT	·	670 m	MPC · JPL
684081	2008 JA_{5}	—	March 11, 2008	Kitt Peak	Spacewatch	EOS	1.6 km	MPC · JPL
684082	2008 JG_{9}	—	April 25, 2008	Kitt Peak	Spacewatch	·	1.9 km	MPC · JPL
684083	2008 JV_{10}	—	April 14, 2008	Mount Lemmon	Mount Lemmon Survey	·	890 m	MPC · JPL
684084	2008 JF_{12}	—	May 3, 2008	Kitt Peak	Spacewatch	·	1.8 km	MPC · JPL
684085	2008 JB_{17}	—	May 3, 2008	Mount Lemmon	Mount Lemmon Survey	·	2.4 km	MPC · JPL
684086	2008 JM_{28}	—	July 31, 2005	Palomar	NEAT	·	1.1 km	MPC · JPL
684087	2008 JX_{41}	—	May 6, 2008	Mount Lemmon	Mount Lemmon Survey	·	810 m	MPC · JPL
684088	2008 JF_{42}	—	May 8, 2008	Mount Lemmon	Mount Lemmon Survey	·	900 m	MPC · JPL
684089	2008 JQ_{42}	—	May 5, 2008	Kitt Peak	Spacewatch	·	830 m	MPC · JPL
684090	2008 JS_{42}	—	September 29, 2010	Mount Lemmon	Mount Lemmon Survey	·	1.7 km	MPC · JPL
684091	2008 JL_{43}	—	May 13, 2008	Mount Lemmon	Mount Lemmon Survey	H	430 m	MPC · JPL
684092	2008 JE_{44}	—	May 14, 2008	Mount Lemmon	Mount Lemmon Survey	·	2.3 km	MPC · JPL
684093	2008 JH_{44}	—	April 8, 2013	Mount Lemmon	Mount Lemmon Survey	·	2.1 km	MPC · JPL
684094	2008 JR_{44}	—	January 20, 2015	Mount Lemmon	Mount Lemmon Survey	·	790 m	MPC · JPL
684095	2008 JW_{44}	—	July 25, 2014	Haleakala	Pan-STARRS 1	·	1.9 km	MPC · JPL
684096	2008 JT_{45}	—	May 14, 2008	Kitt Peak	Spacewatch	·	1.7 km	MPC · JPL
684097	2008 JG_{46}	—	May 5, 2008	Mount Lemmon	Mount Lemmon Survey	·	2.8 km	MPC · JPL
684098	2008 JH_{46}	—	December 1, 2010	Mount Lemmon	Mount Lemmon Survey	AGN	1.0 km	MPC · JPL
684099	2008 JQ_{47}	—	February 3, 2016	Haleakala	Pan-STARRS 1	·	2.0 km	MPC · JPL
684100	2008 JE_{48}	—	May 5, 2008	Kitt Peak	Spacewatch	·	2.5 km	MPC · JPL

== 684101–684200 ==
back to top

Designation			Discovery			Properties		Ref
Permanent	Provisional	Named after	Date	Site	Discoverer(s)	Category	Diam.	Ref
684101	2008 JL_{48}	—	May 5, 2008	Kitt Peak	Spacewatch	·	820 m	MPC · JPL
684102	2008 JW_{48}	—	May 5, 2008	Kitt Peak	Spacewatch	·	2.8 km	MPC · JPL
684103	2008 JS_{49}	—	May 3, 2008	Kitt Peak	Spacewatch	·	1.7 km	MPC · JPL
684104	2008 JE_{50}	—	May 3, 2008	Kitt Peak	Spacewatch	·	760 m	MPC · JPL
684105	2008 JJ_{50}	—	May 15, 2008	Mount Lemmon	Mount Lemmon Survey	EUN	720 m	MPC · JPL
684106	2008 JH_{51}	—	May 2, 2008	Kitt Peak	Spacewatch	·	1.9 km	MPC · JPL
684107	2008 JJ_{51}	—	May 3, 2008	Kitt Peak	Spacewatch	·	890 m	MPC · JPL
684108	2008 JN_{51}	—	May 15, 2008	Kitt Peak	Spacewatch	EOS	1.4 km	MPC · JPL
684109	2008 JA_{53}	—	May 8, 2008	Kitt Peak	Spacewatch	·	460 m	MPC · JPL
684110	2008 JL_{53}	—	May 6, 2008	Mount Lemmon	Mount Lemmon Survey	·	600 m	MPC · JPL
684111	2008 JH_{54}	—	May 3, 2008	Mount Lemmon	Mount Lemmon Survey	EUN	860 m	MPC · JPL
684112	2008 KM_{5}	—	May 28, 2008	Kitt Peak	Spacewatch	·	2.1 km	MPC · JPL
684113	2008 KV_{6}	—	September 29, 2005	Mount Lemmon	Mount Lemmon Survey	MAS	590 m	MPC · JPL
684114	2008 KK_{14}	—	April 14, 2008	Mount Lemmon	Mount Lemmon Survey	·	1.9 km	MPC · JPL
684115	2008 KO_{14}	—	May 27, 2008	Kitt Peak	Spacewatch	·	2.1 km	MPC · JPL
684116	2008 KJ_{16}	—	May 5, 2008	Kitt Peak	Spacewatch	EOS	1.9 km	MPC · JPL
684117	2008 KW_{18}	—	May 28, 2008	Mount Lemmon	Mount Lemmon Survey	·	2.0 km	MPC · JPL
684118	2008 KW_{20}	—	March 16, 2004	Kitt Peak	Spacewatch	·	1.1 km	MPC · JPL
684119	2008 KL_{21}	—	May 28, 2008	Mount Lemmon	Mount Lemmon Survey	·	890 m	MPC · JPL
684120	2008 KW_{21}	—	May 28, 2008	Mount Lemmon	Mount Lemmon Survey	MAR	770 m	MPC · JPL
684121	2008 KC_{22}	—	December 7, 2005	Kitt Peak	Spacewatch	·	2.6 km	MPC · JPL
684122	2008 KU_{22}	—	May 28, 2008	Mount Lemmon	Mount Lemmon Survey	MAR	890 m	MPC · JPL
684123	2008 KE_{23}	—	May 28, 2008	Kitt Peak	Spacewatch	·	2.3 km	MPC · JPL
684124	2008 KV_{23}	—	May 28, 2008	Kitt Peak	Spacewatch	·	2.0 km	MPC · JPL
684125	2008 KH_{28}	—	April 6, 2008	Kitt Peak	Spacewatch	EOS	1.6 km	MPC · JPL
684126	2008 KW_{28}	—	March 23, 2004	Kitt Peak	Spacewatch	·	1.0 km	MPC · JPL
684127	2008 KW_{30}	—	May 3, 2008	Kitt Peak	Spacewatch	·	1.9 km	MPC · JPL
684128	2008 KA_{32}	—	May 5, 2008	Kitt Peak	Spacewatch	·	2.6 km	MPC · JPL
684129	2008 KT_{32}	—	May 3, 2008	Kitt Peak	Spacewatch	PHO	860 m	MPC · JPL
684130	2008 KT_{34}	—	October 19, 2006	Mount Lemmon	Mount Lemmon Survey	H	440 m	MPC · JPL
684131	2008 KR_{36}	—	May 29, 2008	Kitt Peak	Spacewatch	·	700 m	MPC · JPL
684132	2008 KH_{37}	—	May 29, 2008	Mount Lemmon	Mount Lemmon Survey	·	2.0 km	MPC · JPL
684133	2008 KO_{37}	—	May 30, 2008	Kitt Peak	Spacewatch	PHO	1.0 km	MPC · JPL
684134	2008 KM_{38}	—	April 29, 2008	Kitt Peak	Spacewatch	·	2.0 km	MPC · JPL
684135	2008 KX_{39}	—	May 31, 2008	Kitt Peak	Spacewatch	·	1.4 km	MPC · JPL
684136	2008 KS_{43}	—	August 27, 2009	Kitt Peak	Spacewatch	·	740 m	MPC · JPL
684137	2008 KA_{44}	—	January 25, 2012	Haleakala	Pan-STARRS 1	·	1.6 km	MPC · JPL
684138	2008 KD_{44}	—	August 10, 2013	Mount Lemmon	Mount Lemmon Survey	·	1.6 km	MPC · JPL
684139	2008 KE_{44}	—	December 8, 2010	Mount Lemmon	Mount Lemmon Survey	·	1.2 km	MPC · JPL
684140	2008 KF_{44}	—	May 29, 2008	Kitt Peak	Spacewatch	·	3.0 km	MPC · JPL
684141	2008 KH_{44}	—	November 10, 2016	Haleakala	Pan-STARRS 1	EOS	1.8 km	MPC · JPL
684142	2008 KO_{44}	—	September 9, 2015	Haleakala	Pan-STARRS 1	·	2.0 km	MPC · JPL
684143	2008 KQ_{44}	—	March 13, 2013	Haleakala	Pan-STARRS 1	·	2.0 km	MPC · JPL
684144	2008 KR_{44}	—	November 2, 2013	Mount Lemmon	Mount Lemmon Survey	(194)	960 m	MPC · JPL
684145	2008 KW_{44}	—	May 2, 2016	Haleakala	Pan-STARRS 1	·	730 m	MPC · JPL
684146	2008 KG_{45}	—	June 4, 2014	Haleakala	Pan-STARRS 1	·	2.2 km	MPC · JPL
684147	2008 KE_{46}	—	December 30, 2011	Kitt Peak	Spacewatch	·	2.0 km	MPC · JPL
684148	2008 KR_{46}	—	January 14, 2018	Haleakala	Pan-STARRS 1	HYG	1.9 km	MPC · JPL
684149	2008 KU_{46}	—	November 1, 2010	Mount Lemmon	Mount Lemmon Survey	·	2.2 km	MPC · JPL
684150	2008 KC_{47}	—	June 18, 2014	Haleakala	Pan-STARRS 1	·	2.3 km	MPC · JPL
684151	2008 KK_{48}	—	May 16, 2012	Mount Lemmon	Mount Lemmon Survey	·	760 m	MPC · JPL
684152	2008 KC_{49}	—	May 29, 2008	Mount Lemmon	Mount Lemmon Survey	·	2.1 km	MPC · JPL
684153	2008 LY_{1}	—	June 2, 2008	Mount Lemmon	Mount Lemmon Survey	·	1.1 km	MPC · JPL
684154	2008 LC_{3}	—	September 23, 2001	Haleakala	NEAT	·	1.2 km	MPC · JPL
684155	2008 LU_{12}	—	June 10, 2008	Bergisch Gladbach	W. Bickel	·	1.5 km	MPC · JPL
684156	2008 LW_{12}	—	May 13, 2008	Kitt Peak	Spacewatch	H	400 m	MPC · JPL
684157	2008 LU_{18}	—	April 10, 2016	Haleakala	Pan-STARRS 1	·	1.2 km	MPC · JPL
684158	2008 LW_{18}	—	March 13, 2013	Haleakala	Pan-STARRS 1	·	2.4 km	MPC · JPL
684159	2008 LX_{18}	—	June 3, 2016	Mount Lemmon	Mount Lemmon Survey	H	330 m	MPC · JPL
684160	2008 LK_{19}	—	January 1, 2012	Mount Lemmon	Mount Lemmon Survey	·	2.3 km	MPC · JPL
684161	2008 LM_{19}	—	April 12, 2016	Haleakala	Pan-STARRS 1	·	820 m	MPC · JPL
684162	2008 LV_{19}	—	November 22, 2011	Mount Lemmon	Mount Lemmon Survey	·	2.3 km	MPC · JPL
684163	2008 LC_{20}	—	January 20, 2018	Mount Lemmon	Mount Lemmon Survey	·	2.2 km	MPC · JPL
684164	2008 LJ_{20}	—	November 21, 2014	Haleakala	Pan-STARRS 1	L5	6.6 km	MPC · JPL
684165	2008 NQ	—	July 1, 2008	Kitt Peak	Spacewatch	·	1.7 km	MPC · JPL
684166	2008 NT_{5}	—	July 1, 2008	Kitt Peak	Spacewatch	TIR	2.3 km	MPC · JPL
684167	2008 NH_{6}	—	July 2, 2008	Kitt Peak	Spacewatch	·	620 m	MPC · JPL
684168	2008 OU_{4}	—	July 28, 2008	Mount Lemmon	Mount Lemmon Survey	·	3.1 km	MPC · JPL
684169	2008 OW_{4}	—	July 28, 2008	Mount Lemmon	Mount Lemmon Survey	·	470 m	MPC · JPL
684170	2008 OG_{5}	—	July 28, 2008	Mount Lemmon	Mount Lemmon Survey	·	2.2 km	MPC · JPL
684171	2008 OE_{6}	—	July 30, 2008	Mount Lemmon	Mount Lemmon Survey	·	3.1 km	MPC · JPL
684172	2008 OV_{13}	—	November 23, 2003	Anderson Mesa	LONEOS	·	2.6 km	MPC · JPL
684173	2008 OA_{26}	—	October 13, 1998	Kitt Peak	Spacewatch	·	570 m	MPC · JPL
684174	2008 OG_{26}	—	July 30, 2008	Mount Lemmon	Mount Lemmon Survey	·	2.3 km	MPC · JPL
684175	2008 OK_{26}	—	July 28, 2008	Mount Lemmon	Mount Lemmon Survey	MAR	860 m	MPC · JPL
684176	2008 OV_{26}	—	January 2, 2012	Mount Lemmon	Mount Lemmon Survey	TIR	3.1 km	MPC · JPL
684177	2008 OX_{26}	—	August 31, 2014	Haleakala	Pan-STARRS 1	·	2.6 km	MPC · JPL
684178	2008 OU_{27}	—	July 29, 2008	Kitt Peak	Spacewatch	·	1.2 km	MPC · JPL
684179	2008 OW_{27}	—	May 13, 2016	Haleakala	Pan-STARRS 1	EUN	830 m	MPC · JPL
684180	2008 OD_{28}	—	May 16, 2013	Haleakala	Pan-STARRS 1	TIR	3.0 km	MPC · JPL
684181	2008 OT_{28}	—	February 5, 2011	Mount Lemmon	Mount Lemmon Survey	·	2.4 km	MPC · JPL
684182	2008 OU_{28}	—	September 19, 1998	Apache Point	SDSS Collaboration	·	2.2 km	MPC · JPL
684183	2008 OR_{30}	—	October 23, 2009	Mount Lemmon	Mount Lemmon Survey	·	1.3 km	MPC · JPL
684184	2008 OS_{30}	—	April 27, 2012	Haleakala	Pan-STARRS 1	·	1.7 km	MPC · JPL
684185	2008 OJ_{31}	—	July 30, 2008	Mount Lemmon	Mount Lemmon Survey	·	1.2 km	MPC · JPL
684186	2008 OK_{31}	—	July 29, 2008	Kitt Peak	Spacewatch	·	940 m	MPC · JPL
684187	2008 OS_{31}	—	July 30, 2008	Mount Lemmon	Mount Lemmon Survey	EUN	1.0 km	MPC · JPL
684188	2008 OD_{32}	—	July 29, 2008	Kitt Peak	Spacewatch	·	2.3 km	MPC · JPL
684189	2008 PY	—	July 25, 2008	Siding Spring	SSS	·	3.5 km	MPC · JPL
684190	2008 PK_{1}	—	July 1, 2008	Kitt Peak	Spacewatch	·	2.5 km	MPC · JPL
684191	2008 PN_{11}	—	August 8, 2008	Dauban	Kugel, C. R. F.	·	900 m	MPC · JPL
684192	2008 PX_{11}	—	August 10, 2008	Pla D'Arguines	R. Ferrando, Ferrando, M.	·	2.7 km	MPC · JPL
684193	2008 PL_{13}	—	August 10, 2008	La Sagra	OAM	·	2.7 km	MPC · JPL
684194	2008 PZ_{13}	—	August 10, 2008	La Sagra	OAM	·	920 m	MPC · JPL
684195	2008 PB_{14}	—	August 10, 2008	La Sagra	OAM	T_{j} (2.99)	3.3 km	MPC · JPL
684196	2008 PE_{16}	—	August 4, 2008	La Sagra	OAM	·	2.3 km	MPC · JPL
684197	2008 PJ_{23}	—	January 2, 2017	Haleakala	Pan-STARRS 1	·	2.4 km	MPC · JPL
684198	2008 PL_{23}	—	August 28, 2014	Haleakala	Pan-STARRS 1	LIX	2.7 km	MPC · JPL
684199	2008 PS_{23}	—	August 21, 2015	Haleakala	Pan-STARRS 1	·	590 m	MPC · JPL
684200	2008 PK_{24}	—	August 3, 2008	Siding Spring	SSS	·	2.9 km	MPC · JPL

== 684201–684300 ==
back to top

Designation			Discovery			Properties		Ref
Permanent	Provisional	Named after	Date	Site	Discoverer(s)	Category	Diam.	Ref
684201	2008 PM_{24}	—	August 7, 2008	Kitt Peak	Spacewatch	·	1.5 km	MPC · JPL
684202	2008 PX_{24}	—	August 3, 2008	Siding Spring	SSS	MAR	970 m	MPC · JPL
684203	2008 QX_{4}	—	August 21, 2008	Kitt Peak	Spacewatch	·	2.9 km	MPC · JPL
684204	2008 QW_{6}	—	July 30, 2008	La Sagra	OAM	·	3.0 km	MPC · JPL
684205	2008 QE_{14}	—	August 21, 2008	Kitt Peak	Spacewatch	·	1.3 km	MPC · JPL
684206	2008 QV_{17}	—	August 27, 2008	Dauban	Kugel, C. R. F.	EOS	1.8 km	MPC · JPL
684207	2008 QF_{25}	—	July 29, 2008	Kitt Peak	Spacewatch	·	670 m	MPC · JPL
684208	2008 QK_{26}	—	July 29, 2008	Kitt Peak	Spacewatch	·	2.4 km	MPC · JPL
684209	2008 QU_{27}	—	August 30, 2008	La Sagra	OAM	(5)	1.2 km	MPC · JPL
684210	2008 QW_{31}	—	August 30, 2008	Socorro	LINEAR	·	3.2 km	MPC · JPL
684211	2008 QH_{34}	—	August 21, 2008	Kitt Peak	Spacewatch	V	790 m	MPC · JPL
684212	2008 QP_{35}	—	August 27, 2008	Siding Spring	SSS	·	1.7 km	MPC · JPL
684213	2008 QM_{37}	—	August 21, 2008	Kitt Peak	Spacewatch	EUN	810 m	MPC · JPL
684214	2008 QP_{39}	—	August 24, 2008	Kitt Peak	Spacewatch	·	2.3 km	MPC · JPL
684215	2008 QC_{44}	—	September 6, 2008	Catalina	CSS	EUN	1.2 km	MPC · JPL
684216	2008 QR_{48}	—	September 16, 2014	Haleakala	Pan-STARRS 1	·	2.5 km	MPC · JPL
684217	2008 QB_{49}	—	January 3, 2014	Nogales	M. Schwartz, P. R. Holvorcem	BAR	1.2 km	MPC · JPL
684218	2008 QF_{51}	—	August 23, 2008	Kitt Peak	Spacewatch	·	760 m	MPC · JPL
684219	2008 RT_{6}	—	September 30, 2003	Kitt Peak	Spacewatch	·	3.1 km	MPC · JPL
684220	2008 RY_{7}	—	December 1, 2005	Kitt Peak	Wasserman, L. H., Millis, R. L.	·	2.3 km	MPC · JPL
684221	2008 RP_{13}	—	September 4, 2008	Kitt Peak	Spacewatch	·	1.3 km	MPC · JPL
684222	2008 RT_{13}	—	September 4, 2008	Kitt Peak	Spacewatch	·	1.1 km	MPC · JPL
684223	2008 RU_{18}	—	September 4, 2008	Kitt Peak	Spacewatch	·	1.9 km	MPC · JPL
684224	2008 RK_{20}	—	September 4, 2008	Kitt Peak	Spacewatch	EUP	3.6 km	MPC · JPL
684225	2008 RN_{20}	—	September 4, 2008	Kitt Peak	Spacewatch	·	1.0 km	MPC · JPL
684226	2008 RA_{24}	—	September 5, 2008	Socorro	LINEAR	·	1.1 km	MPC · JPL
684227	2008 RC_{25}	—	September 2, 2008	Zelenchukskaya Stn	Zelenchukskaya Stn	·	2.5 km	MPC · JPL
684228	2008 RK_{26}	—	September 2, 2008	Kitt Peak	Spacewatch	·	960 m	MPC · JPL
684229	2008 RO_{29}	—	February 27, 2000	Kitt Peak	Spacewatch	·	3.4 km	MPC · JPL
684230	2008 RB_{32}	—	September 2, 2008	Kitt Peak	Spacewatch	·	500 m	MPC · JPL
684231	2008 RX_{48}	—	September 3, 2008	Kitt Peak	Spacewatch	·	2.2 km	MPC · JPL
684232	2008 RL_{51}	—	September 3, 2008	Kitt Peak	Spacewatch	·	2.2 km	MPC · JPL
684233	2008 RH_{57}	—	September 3, 2008	Kitt Peak	Spacewatch	EOS	1.5 km	MPC · JPL
684234	2008 RS_{57}	—	September 3, 2008	Kitt Peak	Spacewatch	·	2.9 km	MPC · JPL
684235	2008 RF_{61}	—	July 29, 2008	Mount Lemmon	Mount Lemmon Survey	·	1.3 km	MPC · JPL
684236	2008 RM_{62}	—	September 4, 2008	Kitt Peak	Spacewatch	·	1.1 km	MPC · JPL
684237	2008 RU_{63}	—	September 4, 2008	Kitt Peak	Spacewatch	·	2.3 km	MPC · JPL
684238	2008 RM_{65}	—	September 4, 2008	Kitt Peak	Spacewatch	·	1.1 km	MPC · JPL
684239	2008 RU_{65}	—	March 26, 2007	Kitt Peak	Spacewatch	·	1.1 km	MPC · JPL
684240	2008 RR_{66}	—	September 4, 2008	Kitt Peak	Spacewatch	·	1.1 km	MPC · JPL
684241	2008 RD_{69}	—	September 4, 2008	Kitt Peak	Spacewatch	·	2.8 km	MPC · JPL
684242	2008 RV_{69}	—	September 5, 2008	Kitt Peak	Spacewatch	·	540 m	MPC · JPL
684243	2008 RN_{72}	—	September 6, 2008	Mount Lemmon	Mount Lemmon Survey	·	1.0 km	MPC · JPL
684244	2008 RU_{72}	—	September 6, 2008	Mount Lemmon	Mount Lemmon Survey	·	570 m	MPC · JPL
684245	2008 RD_{74}	—	September 6, 2008	Catalina	CSS	·	2.6 km	MPC · JPL
684246	2008 RP_{74}	—	September 6, 2008	Catalina	CSS	THB	3.0 km	MPC · JPL
684247	2008 RL_{79}	—	September 1, 2008	La Sagra	OAM	·	2.5 km	MPC · JPL
684248	2008 RX_{86}	—	September 5, 2008	Kitt Peak	Spacewatch	·	1.2 km	MPC · JPL
684249	2008 RK_{90}	—	September 6, 2008	Catalina	CSS	·	620 m	MPC · JPL
684250	2008 RE_{93}	—	September 6, 2008	Kitt Peak	Spacewatch	4:3	4.3 km	MPC · JPL
684251	2008 RO_{95}	—	July 29, 2008	Kitt Peak	Spacewatch	·	600 m	MPC · JPL
684252	2008 RD_{99}	—	September 2, 2008	Kitt Peak	Spacewatch	·	3.1 km	MPC · JPL
684253	2008 RV_{106}	—	September 7, 2008	Mount Lemmon	Mount Lemmon Survey	(1547)	1.1 km	MPC · JPL
684254	2008 RM_{121}	—	September 2, 2008	Kitt Peak	Spacewatch	·	2.9 km	MPC · JPL
684255	2008 RD_{131}	—	September 9, 2008	Mount Lemmon	Mount Lemmon Survey	·	1.2 km	MPC · JPL
684256	2008 RN_{132}	—	September 6, 2008	Catalina	CSS	·	1.2 km	MPC · JPL
684257	2008 RC_{135}	—	September 2, 2008	Kitt Peak	Spacewatch	·	650 m	MPC · JPL
684258	2008 RH_{135}	—	September 2, 2008	Kitt Peak	Spacewatch	·	1.1 km	MPC · JPL
684259	2008 RA_{138}	—	September 5, 2008	Kitt Peak	Spacewatch	V	450 m	MPC · JPL
684260	2008 RR_{141}	—	September 21, 2003	Kitt Peak	Spacewatch	·	2.8 km	MPC · JPL
684261	2008 RJ_{144}	—	September 2, 2008	Kitt Peak	Spacewatch	·	2.0 km	MPC · JPL
684262	2008 RV_{144}	—	September 4, 2008	Kitt Peak	Spacewatch	WIT	740 m	MPC · JPL
684263	2008 RE_{146}	—	September 5, 2008	Kitt Peak	Spacewatch	EOS	1.6 km	MPC · JPL
684264	2008 RT_{148}	—	September 7, 2008	Mount Lemmon	Mount Lemmon Survey	·	1.3 km	MPC · JPL
684265	2008 RW_{148}	—	September 3, 2008	Kitt Peak	Spacewatch	·	2.6 km	MPC · JPL
684266	2008 RZ_{148}	—	September 6, 2008	Siding Spring	SSS	·	1.5 km	MPC · JPL
684267	2008 RQ_{149}	—	September 3, 2008	Kitt Peak	Spacewatch	3:2	4.2 km	MPC · JPL
684268	2008 RY_{149}	—	March 4, 2011	Mount Lemmon	Mount Lemmon Survey	·	2.8 km	MPC · JPL
684269	2008 RL_{150}	—	February 23, 2011	Kitt Peak	Spacewatch	·	2.5 km	MPC · JPL
684270	2008 RM_{150}	—	September 5, 2008	Kitt Peak	Spacewatch	·	2.8 km	MPC · JPL
684271	2008 RP_{150}	—	February 15, 2010	Mount Lemmon	Mount Lemmon Survey	·	1.2 km	MPC · JPL
684272	2008 RU_{150}	—	September 4, 2008	Kitt Peak	Spacewatch	·	2.3 km	MPC · JPL
684273	2008 RD_{151}	—	November 10, 2004	Kitt Peak	Spacewatch	·	1.3 km	MPC · JPL
684274	2008 RT_{151}	—	January 27, 2011	Mount Lemmon	Mount Lemmon Survey	·	2.4 km	MPC · JPL
684275	2008 RG_{152}	—	September 6, 2008	Mount Lemmon	Mount Lemmon Survey	·	1.3 km	MPC · JPL
684276	2008 RZ_{152}	—	September 4, 2008	Kitt Peak	Spacewatch	·	2.2 km	MPC · JPL
684277	2008 RE_{153}	—	September 2, 2014	Haleakala	Pan-STARRS 1	·	2.6 km	MPC · JPL
684278	2008 RL_{154}	—	August 18, 2014	Haleakala	Pan-STARRS 1	T_{j} (2.96)	2.7 km	MPC · JPL
684279	2008 RA_{156}	—	August 25, 2008	Črni Vrh	Matičič, S.	·	620 m	MPC · JPL
684280	2008 RC_{156}	—	February 25, 2011	Mount Lemmon	Mount Lemmon Survey	·	2.1 km	MPC · JPL
684281	2008 RE_{156}	—	January 30, 2011	Haleakala	Pan-STARRS 1	·	2.5 km	MPC · JPL
684282	2008 RR_{156}	—	September 9, 2008	Mount Lemmon	Mount Lemmon Survey	·	550 m	MPC · JPL
684283	2008 RS_{156}	—	February 25, 2015	Kitt Peak	Spacewatch	·	1.3 km	MPC · JPL
684284	2008 RC_{162}	—	February 5, 2011	Haleakala	Pan-STARRS 1	·	2.2 km	MPC · JPL
684285	2008 RH_{162}	—	September 3, 2008	Kitt Peak	Spacewatch	·	1.8 km	MPC · JPL
684286	2008 RU_{165}	—	September 6, 2008	Kitt Peak	Spacewatch	·	2.2 km	MPC · JPL
684287	2008 RB_{168}	—	September 9, 2008	Mount Lemmon	Mount Lemmon Survey	GAL	1.2 km	MPC · JPL
684288	2008 RW_{168}	—	September 5, 2008	Kitt Peak	Spacewatch	·	2.4 km	MPC · JPL
684289	2008 RY_{168}	—	September 7, 2008	Mount Lemmon	Mount Lemmon Survey	EOS	1.4 km	MPC · JPL
684290	2008 RC_{170}	—	September 9, 2008	Mount Lemmon	Mount Lemmon Survey	·	1.2 km	MPC · JPL
684291	2008 RO_{170}	—	September 4, 2008	Kitt Peak	Spacewatch	·	1.3 km	MPC · JPL
684292	2008 RX_{170}	—	September 6, 2008	Kitt Peak	Spacewatch	·	2.5 km	MPC · JPL
684293	2008 RP_{171}	—	September 2, 2008	Kitt Peak	Spacewatch	·	1.0 km	MPC · JPL
684294	2008 RB_{172}	—	September 4, 2008	Kitt Peak	Spacewatch	·	1.4 km	MPC · JPL
684295	2008 RH_{172}	—	September 6, 2008	Kitt Peak	Spacewatch	·	1.5 km	MPC · JPL
684296	2008 RR_{173}	—	September 9, 2008	Catalina	CSS	·	1.6 km	MPC · JPL
684297	2008 RY_{174}	—	September 9, 2008	Mount Lemmon	Mount Lemmon Survey	·	1.2 km	MPC · JPL
684298	2008 RU_{178}	—	September 3, 2008	Kitt Peak	Spacewatch	·	1.1 km	MPC · JPL
684299	2008 RD_{179}	—	September 4, 2008	Kitt Peak	Spacewatch	·	510 m	MPC · JPL
684300	2008 RP_{179}	—	September 4, 2008	Kitt Peak	Spacewatch	·	1.3 km	MPC · JPL

== 684301–684400 ==
back to top

Designation			Discovery			Properties		Ref
Permanent	Provisional	Named after	Date	Site	Discoverer(s)	Category	Diam.	Ref
684301	2008 RP_{180}	—	September 5, 2008	Kitt Peak	Spacewatch	·	1.1 km	MPC · JPL
684302	2008 RS_{181}	—	September 4, 2008	Kitt Peak	Spacewatch	·	1.1 km	MPC · JPL
684303	2008 RW_{184}	—	April 15, 2007	Kitt Peak	Spacewatch	·	520 m	MPC · JPL
684304	2008 RO_{186}	—	September 6, 2008	Kitt Peak	Spacewatch	L4	5.9 km	MPC · JPL
684305	2008 SK_{5}	—	September 4, 2008	Kitt Peak	Spacewatch	·	1.5 km	MPC · JPL
684306	2008 SB_{13}	—	July 29, 2008	Kitt Peak	Spacewatch	(5)	1.0 km	MPC · JPL
684307	2008 SF_{17}	—	October 8, 2004	Kitt Peak	Spacewatch	·	1.6 km	MPC · JPL
684308	2008 SU_{24}	—	September 3, 2008	Kitt Peak	Spacewatch	(7744)	1.1 km	MPC · JPL
684309	2008 SU_{25}	—	September 7, 2008	Mount Lemmon	Mount Lemmon Survey	·	490 m	MPC · JPL
684310	2008 SY_{29}	—	September 4, 2008	Kitt Peak	Spacewatch	·	1.5 km	MPC · JPL
684311	2008 SW_{30}	—	September 20, 2008	Kitt Peak	Spacewatch	·	620 m	MPC · JPL
684312	2008 SJ_{35}	—	September 20, 2008	Kitt Peak	Spacewatch	·	1.3 km	MPC · JPL
684313	2008 SZ_{48}	—	March 25, 2003	Palomar	NEAT	·	1.1 km	MPC · JPL
684314	2008 SD_{63}	—	October 21, 2003	Kitt Peak	Spacewatch	·	3.0 km	MPC · JPL
684315	2008 SM_{69}	—	September 9, 2008	Mount Lemmon	Mount Lemmon Survey	·	700 m	MPC · JPL
684316	2008 SS_{75}	—	September 23, 2008	Mount Lemmon	Mount Lemmon Survey	·	1.1 km	MPC · JPL
684317	2008 SB_{76}	—	September 23, 2008	Mount Lemmon	Mount Lemmon Survey	·	970 m	MPC · JPL
684318	2008 SH_{80}	—	September 23, 2008	Kitt Peak	Spacewatch	·	1.1 km	MPC · JPL
684319	2008 SJ_{83}	—	September 27, 2008	Taunus	E. Schwab, Karge, S.	·	1.4 km	MPC · JPL
684320	2008 ST_{87}	—	December 19, 2004	Mount Lemmon	Mount Lemmon Survey	·	2.3 km	MPC · JPL
684321	2008 SW_{87}	—	September 20, 2008	Kitt Peak	Spacewatch	·	1.4 km	MPC · JPL
684322	2008 SB_{105}	—	September 21, 2008	Kitt Peak	Spacewatch	·	720 m	MPC · JPL
684323	2008 SV_{105}	—	September 21, 2008	Kitt Peak	Spacewatch	·	2.2 km	MPC · JPL
684324	2008 SO_{108}	—	October 7, 2005	Mauna Kea	A. Boattini	AGN	1.0 km	MPC · JPL
684325	2008 SA_{111}	—	September 22, 2008	Kitt Peak	Spacewatch	·	630 m	MPC · JPL
684326	2008 SB_{112}	—	September 22, 2008	Kitt Peak	Spacewatch	·	2.4 km	MPC · JPL
684327	2008 SG_{113}	—	September 8, 2008	Kitt Peak	Spacewatch	·	2.2 km	MPC · JPL
684328	2008 SV_{121}	—	September 22, 2008	Mount Lemmon	Mount Lemmon Survey	·	3.2 km	MPC · JPL
684329	2008 ST_{133}	—	September 23, 2008	Kitt Peak	Spacewatch	·	1.2 km	MPC · JPL
684330	2008 SX_{136}	—	September 23, 2008	Kitt Peak	Spacewatch	·	1.2 km	MPC · JPL
684331	2008 SK_{140}	—	September 24, 2008	Mount Lemmon	Mount Lemmon Survey	·	1.1 km	MPC · JPL
684332	2008 SP_{141}	—	September 9, 2008	Mount Lemmon	Mount Lemmon Survey	·	1.2 km	MPC · JPL
684333	2008 SA_{145}	—	September 26, 2008	Mount Lemmon	Mount Lemmon Survey	·	1.7 km	MPC · JPL
684334	2008 SH_{152}	—	August 31, 2008	Uccle	P. De Cat, E. W. Elst	·	700 m	MPC · JPL
684335	2008 SF_{167}	—	September 22, 2008	Kitt Peak	Spacewatch	·	2.5 km	MPC · JPL
684336	2008 SE_{168}	—	September 19, 2004	Piszkéstető	K. Sárneczky	·	1.5 km	MPC · JPL
684337	2008 SB_{170}	—	September 21, 2008	Mount Lemmon	Mount Lemmon Survey	·	1.5 km	MPC · JPL
684338	2008 SL_{171}	—	October 23, 2004	Kitt Peak	Spacewatch	·	1.3 km	MPC · JPL
684339	2008 SW_{178}	—	April 19, 2007	Kitt Peak	Spacewatch	(5)	1.0 km	MPC · JPL
684340	2008 SX_{178}	—	September 24, 2008	Kitt Peak	Spacewatch	·	1.1 km	MPC · JPL
684341	2008 SB_{179}	—	September 24, 2008	Kitt Peak	Spacewatch	T_{j} (2.98)	3.1 km	MPC · JPL
684342	2008 SY_{188}	—	September 25, 2008	Kitt Peak	Spacewatch	EOS	1.6 km	MPC · JPL
684343	2008 SV_{190}	—	September 25, 2008	Mount Lemmon	Mount Lemmon Survey	·	980 m	MPC · JPL
684344	2008 SH_{217}	—	September 29, 2008	Mount Lemmon	Mount Lemmon Survey	·	1.2 km	MPC · JPL
684345	2008 SG_{222}	—	September 3, 2008	Kitt Peak	Spacewatch	·	1.5 km	MPC · JPL
684346	2008 SG_{227}	—	October 27, 2005	Mount Lemmon	Mount Lemmon Survey	·	710 m	MPC · JPL
684347	2008 SB_{230}	—	September 28, 2008	Mount Lemmon	Mount Lemmon Survey	·	1.1 km	MPC · JPL
684348	2008 SE_{232}	—	September 5, 2008	Kitt Peak	Spacewatch	·	620 m	MPC · JPL
684349	2008 SU_{232}	—	September 28, 2008	Mount Lemmon	Mount Lemmon Survey	·	1.1 km	MPC · JPL
684350	2008 SV_{244}	—	September 29, 2008	Catalina	CSS	(5)	1.1 km	MPC · JPL
684351	2008 SP_{248}	—	September 20, 2008	Kitt Peak	Spacewatch	H	430 m	MPC · JPL
684352	2008 SA_{249}	—	September 21, 2008	Kitt Peak	Spacewatch	·	1.1 km	MPC · JPL
684353	2008 SU_{255}	—	September 24, 2008	Kitt Peak	Spacewatch	·	1.1 km	MPC · JPL
684354	2008 SN_{262}	—	September 24, 2008	Kitt Peak	Spacewatch	·	510 m	MPC · JPL
684355	2008 SD_{264}	—	September 24, 2008	Kitt Peak	Spacewatch	·	520 m	MPC · JPL
684356	2008 SS_{272}	—	September 24, 2008	Mount Lemmon	Mount Lemmon Survey	·	1.2 km	MPC · JPL
684357	2008 SY_{272}	—	September 27, 2008	Mount Lemmon	Mount Lemmon Survey	·	630 m	MPC · JPL
684358	2008 SH_{277}	—	September 24, 2008	Kitt Peak	Spacewatch	·	1.2 km	MPC · JPL
684359	2008 SC_{284}	—	September 23, 2008	Kitt Peak	Spacewatch	·	1.4 km	MPC · JPL
684360	2008 SS_{284}	—	September 24, 2008	Kitt Peak	Spacewatch	·	1.2 km	MPC · JPL
684361	2008 SE_{287}	—	September 23, 2008	Mount Lemmon	Mount Lemmon Survey	·	1.1 km	MPC · JPL
684362	2008 ST_{289}	—	September 27, 2008	Bergisch Gladbach	W. Bickel	·	2.7 km	MPC · JPL
684363	2008 SH_{297}	—	September 29, 2008	Catalina	CSS	·	1.8 km	MPC · JPL
684364	2008 SH_{310}	—	July 31, 2003	Mauna Kea	D. D. Balam, K. M. Perrett	·	1.3 km	MPC · JPL
684365	2008 SV_{313}	—	September 24, 2008	Kitt Peak	Spacewatch	·	700 m	MPC · JPL
684366	2008 SY_{313}	—	August 3, 2004	Siding Spring	SSS	·	1.1 km	MPC · JPL
684367	2008 SR_{314}	—	September 23, 2008	Mount Lemmon	Mount Lemmon Survey	HNS	960 m	MPC · JPL
684368	2008 SW_{314}	—	September 29, 2008	Catalina	CSS	·	2.9 km	MPC · JPL
684369	2008 SZ_{314}	—	September 22, 2008	Mount Lemmon	Mount Lemmon Survey	3:2	4.3 km	MPC · JPL
684370	2008 SD_{315}	—	April 17, 2015	Mount Lemmon	Mount Lemmon Survey	·	1.4 km	MPC · JPL
684371	2008 SF_{315}	—	February 3, 2012	Haleakala	Pan-STARRS 1	·	3.1 km	MPC · JPL
684372	2008 SC_{316}	—	December 6, 2013	Haleakala	Pan-STARRS 1	·	1.5 km	MPC · JPL
684373	2008 SM_{316}	—	September 23, 2008	Kitt Peak	Spacewatch	·	1.2 km	MPC · JPL
684374	2008 SW_{316}	—	September 25, 2008	Kitt Peak	Spacewatch	·	1.5 km	MPC · JPL
684375	2008 SH_{317}	—	July 14, 2013	Haleakala	Pan-STARRS 1	·	2.4 km	MPC · JPL
684376	2008 SB_{318}	—	September 24, 2008	Mount Lemmon	Mount Lemmon Survey	·	960 m	MPC · JPL
684377	2008 SF_{319}	—	September 28, 2008	Mount Lemmon	Mount Lemmon Survey	·	1.3 km	MPC · JPL
684378	2008 SC_{320}	—	September 22, 2008	Mount Lemmon	Mount Lemmon Survey	EUP	2.9 km	MPC · JPL
684379	2008 SB_{322}	—	September 20, 2008	Mount Lemmon	Mount Lemmon Survey	EUN	990 m	MPC · JPL
684380	2008 SB_{324}	—	September 22, 2008	Kitt Peak	Spacewatch	THM	2.1 km	MPC · JPL
684381	2008 SE_{324}	—	September 24, 2008	Mount Lemmon	Mount Lemmon Survey	EOS	1.5 km	MPC · JPL
684382	2008 SH_{324}	—	September 22, 2008	Mount Lemmon	Mount Lemmon Survey	·	2.4 km	MPC · JPL
684383	2008 SN_{324}	—	September 23, 2015	Haleakala	Pan-STARRS 1	·	650 m	MPC · JPL
684384	2008 SH_{326}	—	August 9, 2013	Haleakala	Pan-STARRS 1	·	1.3 km	MPC · JPL
684385	2008 SC_{327}	—	April 1, 2011	Kitt Peak	Spacewatch	EOS	1.6 km	MPC · JPL
684386	2008 SZ_{331}	—	September 23, 2008	Kitt Peak	Spacewatch	·	2.4 km	MPC · JPL
684387	2008 SF_{333}	—	September 29, 2008	Kitt Peak	Spacewatch	·	1.1 km	MPC · JPL
684388	2008 SV_{335}	—	September 24, 2008	Mount Lemmon	Mount Lemmon Survey	·	1.2 km	MPC · JPL
684389	2008 SK_{338}	—	September 23, 2008	Kitt Peak	Spacewatch	·	1.1 km	MPC · JPL
684390	2008 SZ_{338}	—	September 23, 2008	Kitt Peak	Spacewatch	L4	6.7 km	MPC · JPL
684391	2008 SH_{339}	—	September 25, 2008	Kitt Peak	Spacewatch	·	3.2 km	MPC · JPL
684392	2008 SV_{339}	—	September 23, 2008	Kitt Peak	Spacewatch	·	1.1 km	MPC · JPL
684393	2008 SE_{340}	—	September 8, 1999	Kitt Peak	Spacewatch	·	1.2 km	MPC · JPL
684394	2008 ST_{340}	—	September 28, 2008	Mount Lemmon	Mount Lemmon Survey	·	530 m	MPC · JPL
684395	2008 SJ_{341}	—	September 26, 2008	Kitt Peak	Spacewatch	·	1.7 km	MPC · JPL
684396	2008 SR_{341}	—	September 22, 2008	Kitt Peak	Spacewatch	·	1.2 km	MPC · JPL
684397	2008 SU_{341}	—	September 23, 2008	Kitt Peak	Spacewatch	·	1.2 km	MPC · JPL
684398	2008 SY_{341}	—	September 26, 2008	Kitt Peak	Spacewatch	·	1.2 km	MPC · JPL
684399	2008 SE_{342}	—	September 23, 2008	Kitt Peak	Spacewatch	·	1.4 km	MPC · JPL
684400	2008 SF_{342}	—	September 24, 2008	Mount Lemmon	Mount Lemmon Survey	·	1.2 km	MPC · JPL

== 684401–684500 ==
back to top

Designation			Discovery			Properties		Ref
Permanent	Provisional	Named after	Date	Site	Discoverer(s)	Category	Diam.	Ref
684401	2008 SA_{343}	—	September 19, 2008	Kitt Peak	Spacewatch	(17392)	1.1 km	MPC · JPL
684402	2008 SX_{343}	—	September 25, 2008	Kitt Peak	Spacewatch	·	940 m	MPC · JPL
684403	2008 SY_{343}	—	September 22, 2008	Mount Lemmon	Mount Lemmon Survey	·	890 m	MPC · JPL
684404	2008 SF_{344}	—	September 24, 2008	Mount Lemmon	Mount Lemmon Survey	·	1.4 km	MPC · JPL
684405	2008 SB_{349}	—	September 23, 2008	Kitt Peak	Spacewatch	·	1.3 km	MPC · JPL
684406	2008 SE_{350}	—	September 24, 2008	Mount Lemmon	Mount Lemmon Survey	·	1.1 km	MPC · JPL
684407	2008 SA_{351}	—	September 27, 2008	Mount Lemmon	Mount Lemmon Survey	HNS	720 m	MPC · JPL
684408	2008 SP_{351}	—	September 29, 2008	Mount Lemmon	Mount Lemmon Survey	·	1.1 km	MPC · JPL
684409	2008 SP_{353}	—	September 25, 2008	Kitt Peak	Spacewatch	·	1.2 km	MPC · JPL
684410	2008 SK_{354}	—	September 29, 2008	Mount Lemmon	Mount Lemmon Survey	·	1.3 km	MPC · JPL
684411	2008 SA_{355}	—	September 23, 2008	Kitt Peak	Spacewatch	·	1.1 km	MPC · JPL
684412	2008 ST_{355}	—	September 29, 2008	Mount Lemmon	Mount Lemmon Survey	·	1.1 km	MPC · JPL
684413	2008 TQ_{1}	—	October 1, 2008	Mount Lemmon	Mount Lemmon Survey	·	1.2 km	MPC · JPL
684414	2008 TM_{7}	—	September 2, 2008	Kitt Peak	Spacewatch	·	1.2 km	MPC · JPL
684415	2008 TY_{7}	—	September 6, 2008	Catalina	CSS	·	1.6 km	MPC · JPL
684416	2008 TR_{9}	—	September 24, 2008	Catalina	CSS	·	1.8 km	MPC · JPL
684417	2008 TV_{10}	—	September 10, 2008	Kitt Peak	Spacewatch	·	1.2 km	MPC · JPL
684418	2008 TO_{12}	—	September 21, 2008	Kitt Peak	Spacewatch	·	1.9 km	MPC · JPL
684419	2008 TL_{15}	—	September 2, 2008	Kitt Peak	Spacewatch	·	1.1 km	MPC · JPL
684420	2008 TD_{17}	—	September 7, 2008	Mount Lemmon	Mount Lemmon Survey	·	750 m	MPC · JPL
684421	2008 TV_{18}	—	October 1, 2008	Mount Lemmon	Mount Lemmon Survey	·	2.5 km	MPC · JPL
684422	2008 TW_{29}	—	September 19, 2008	Kitt Peak	Spacewatch	·	1.3 km	MPC · JPL
684423	2008 TQ_{31}	—	October 1, 2008	Kitt Peak	Spacewatch	·	2.2 km	MPC · JPL
684424	2008 TL_{32}	—	October 1, 2008	Kitt Peak	Spacewatch	·	2.6 km	MPC · JPL
684425	2008 TF_{34}	—	October 1, 2008	Kitt Peak	Spacewatch	EOS	1.5 km	MPC · JPL
684426	2008 TC_{35}	—	September 4, 2008	Kitt Peak	Spacewatch	HNS	830 m	MPC · JPL
684427	2008 TU_{45}	—	October 1, 2008	Kitt Peak	Spacewatch	(5)	1.1 km	MPC · JPL
684428	2008 TA_{49}	—	September 5, 2008	Kitt Peak	Spacewatch	·	2.5 km	MPC · JPL
684429	2008 TV_{54}	—	September 9, 2008	Mount Lemmon	Mount Lemmon Survey	·	640 m	MPC · JPL
684430	2008 TK_{55}	—	October 2, 2008	Kitt Peak	Spacewatch	EOS	1.6 km	MPC · JPL
684431	2008 TQ_{59}	—	October 2, 2008	Kitt Peak	Spacewatch	·	2.7 km	MPC · JPL
684432	2008 TJ_{61}	—	October 2, 2008	Kitt Peak	Spacewatch	·	1.2 km	MPC · JPL
684433	2008 TP_{62}	—	September 6, 2008	Mount Lemmon	Mount Lemmon Survey	VER	2.6 km	MPC · JPL
684434	2008 TY_{76}	—	September 10, 2008	Kitt Peak	Spacewatch	·	550 m	MPC · JPL
684435	2008 TX_{77}	—	September 23, 2008	Mount Lemmon	Mount Lemmon Survey	·	610 m	MPC · JPL
684436	2008 TZ_{80}	—	October 2, 2008	Mount Lemmon	Mount Lemmon Survey	·	910 m	MPC · JPL
684437	2008 TS_{81}	—	September 24, 2008	Kitt Peak	Spacewatch	·	2.3 km	MPC · JPL
684438	2008 TP_{84}	—	September 6, 2008	Mount Lemmon	Mount Lemmon Survey	EOS	1.4 km	MPC · JPL
684439	2008 TJ_{89}	—	September 25, 2008	Kitt Peak	Spacewatch	·	1.3 km	MPC · JPL
684440	2008 TZ_{92}	—	September 3, 2008	Kitt Peak	Spacewatch	EUN	950 m	MPC · JPL
684441	2008 TK_{96}	—	September 4, 2008	Kitt Peak	Spacewatch	·	610 m	MPC · JPL
684442	2008 TV_{99}	—	September 24, 2008	Kitt Peak	Spacewatch	·	1.2 km	MPC · JPL
684443	2008 TT_{101}	—	September 24, 2008	Kitt Peak	Spacewatch	·	2.0 km	MPC · JPL
684444	2008 TD_{106}	—	October 6, 2008	Kitt Peak	Spacewatch	·	550 m	MPC · JPL
684445	2008 TF_{117}	—	October 6, 2008	Mount Lemmon	Mount Lemmon Survey	EMA	2.7 km	MPC · JPL
684446	2008 TD_{119}	—	September 3, 2008	Kitt Peak	Spacewatch	·	2.1 km	MPC · JPL
684447	2008 TM_{119}	—	September 5, 2008	Kitt Peak	Spacewatch	·	2.2 km	MPC · JPL
684448	2008 TJ_{123}	—	October 7, 2008	Kitt Peak	Spacewatch	·	1.5 km	MPC · JPL
684449	2008 TO_{123}	—	October 8, 2008	Mount Lemmon	Mount Lemmon Survey	·	2.7 km	MPC · JPL
684450	2008 TY_{132}	—	October 8, 2008	Mount Lemmon	Mount Lemmon Survey	·	3.1 km	MPC · JPL
684451	2008 TY_{134}	—	September 22, 2008	Kitt Peak	Spacewatch	·	2.8 km	MPC · JPL
684452	2008 TK_{141}	—	October 9, 2008	Mount Lemmon	Mount Lemmon Survey	·	470 m	MPC · JPL
684453	2008 TL_{141}	—	September 2, 2008	Kitt Peak	Spacewatch	·	1.9 km	MPC · JPL
684454	2008 TK_{143}	—	September 2, 2008	Kitt Peak	Spacewatch	·	1.3 km	MPC · JPL
684455	2008 TK_{144}	—	October 9, 2008	Mount Lemmon	Mount Lemmon Survey	·	1.2 km	MPC · JPL
684456	2008 TA_{145}	—	October 9, 2008	Mount Lemmon	Mount Lemmon Survey	HYG	2.3 km	MPC · JPL
684457	2008 TE_{146}	—	September 2, 2008	Kitt Peak	Spacewatch	·	1.0 km	MPC · JPL
684458	2008 TP_{147}	—	October 9, 2008	Mount Lemmon	Mount Lemmon Survey	·	2.1 km	MPC · JPL
684459	2008 TR_{148}	—	October 9, 2008	Mount Lemmon	Mount Lemmon Survey	·	1.6 km	MPC · JPL
684460	2008 TJ_{149}	—	September 3, 2008	Kitt Peak	Spacewatch	·	1.3 km	MPC · JPL
684461	2008 TO_{149}	—	October 9, 2008	Mount Lemmon	Mount Lemmon Survey	·	2.4 km	MPC · JPL
684462	2008 TO_{155}	—	October 9, 2008	Mount Lemmon	Mount Lemmon Survey	·	1.8 km	MPC · JPL
684463	2008 TZ_{156}	—	September 20, 2008	Catalina	CSS	HYG	2.7 km	MPC · JPL
684464	2008 TX_{157}	—	September 23, 2008	Catalina	CSS	·	3.3 km	MPC · JPL
684465	2008 TC_{158}	—	October 5, 2008	La Sagra	OAM	·	3.9 km	MPC · JPL
684466	2008 TJ_{163}	—	October 1, 2008	Kitt Peak	Spacewatch	EOS	1.7 km	MPC · JPL
684467	2008 TX_{163}	—	October 1, 2008	Kitt Peak	Spacewatch	·	580 m	MPC · JPL
684468	2008 TO_{169}	—	October 7, 2008	Kitt Peak	Spacewatch	·	2.2 km	MPC · JPL
684469	2008 TL_{173}	—	October 2, 2008	Mount Lemmon	Mount Lemmon Survey	·	1.2 km	MPC · JPL
684470	2008 TL_{175}	—	October 8, 2008	Mount Lemmon	Mount Lemmon Survey	·	990 m	MPC · JPL
684471	2008 TK_{177}	—	September 10, 2008	Siding Spring	SSS	·	1.8 km	MPC · JPL
684472	2008 TP_{178}	—	October 1, 2008	Catalina	CSS	T_{j} (2.99)	3.5 km	MPC · JPL
684473	2008 TQ_{179}	—	December 7, 2005	Kitt Peak	Spacewatch	·	690 m	MPC · JPL
684474	2008 TA_{180}	—	September 8, 2008	Siding Spring	SSS	T_{j} (2.97)	2.9 km	MPC · JPL
684475	2008 TA_{187}	—	October 8, 2008	Kitt Peak	Spacewatch	·	2.3 km	MPC · JPL
684476	2008 TN_{187}	—	October 8, 2008	Catalina	CSS	·	1.6 km	MPC · JPL
684477	2008 TV_{188}	—	September 16, 2003	Kitt Peak	Spacewatch	·	1.7 km	MPC · JPL
684478	2008 TD_{191}	—	September 4, 2008	Kitt Peak	Spacewatch	·	1.4 km	MPC · JPL
684479	2008 TJ_{193}	—	October 8, 2008	Kitt Peak	Spacewatch	·	2.8 km	MPC · JPL
684480	2008 TQ_{193}	—	October 10, 2008	Mount Lemmon	Mount Lemmon Survey	H	540 m	MPC · JPL
684481	2008 TE_{194}	—	October 7, 2008	Mount Lemmon	Mount Lemmon Survey	·	1.5 km	MPC · JPL
684482	2008 TO_{194}	—	October 6, 2012	Haleakala	Pan-STARRS 1	·	1.2 km	MPC · JPL
684483	2008 TM_{195}	—	January 6, 2012	Haleakala	Pan-STARRS 1	·	2.5 km	MPC · JPL
684484	2008 TM_{197}	—	October 7, 2008	Mount Lemmon	Mount Lemmon Survey	·	1.6 km	MPC · JPL
684485	2008 TK_{198}	—	May 8, 2011	Mount Lemmon	Mount Lemmon Survey	·	1.8 km	MPC · JPL
684486	2008 TS_{198}	—	October 8, 2008	Mount Lemmon	Mount Lemmon Survey	·	1.3 km	MPC · JPL
684487	2008 TP_{200}	—	October 8, 2008	Kitt Peak	Spacewatch	(7744)	1.2 km	MPC · JPL
684488	2008 TL_{201}	—	October 8, 2008	Kitt Peak	Spacewatch	·	1.3 km	MPC · JPL
684489	2008 TO_{201}	—	October 9, 2008	Mount Lemmon	Mount Lemmon Survey	·	1.5 km	MPC · JPL
684490	2008 TY_{203}	—	October 7, 2008	Mount Lemmon	Mount Lemmon Survey	LIX	3.3 km	MPC · JPL
684491	2008 TA_{204}	—	October 7, 2008	Mount Lemmon	Mount Lemmon Survey	·	2.3 km	MPC · JPL
684492	2008 TR_{205}	—	October 6, 2008	Mount Lemmon	Mount Lemmon Survey	·	560 m	MPC · JPL
684493	2008 TF_{206}	—	August 7, 2002	Palomar	NEAT	·	2.3 km	MPC · JPL
684494	2008 TB_{207}	—	November 28, 2013	Kitt Peak	Spacewatch	·	1.3 km	MPC · JPL
684495	2008 TS_{208}	—	May 21, 2012	Mount Lemmon	Mount Lemmon Survey	VER	2.1 km	MPC · JPL
684496	2008 TP_{211}	—	March 4, 2017	Haleakala	Pan-STARRS 1	·	580 m	MPC · JPL
684497	2008 TA_{212}	—	September 23, 2008	Mount Lemmon	Mount Lemmon Survey	·	1.2 km	MPC · JPL
684498	2008 TK_{212}	—	January 22, 2013	Mount Lemmon	Mount Lemmon Survey	·	570 m	MPC · JPL
684499	2008 TJ_{213}	—	October 7, 2008	Kitt Peak	Spacewatch	·	1.3 km	MPC · JPL
684500	2008 TR_{213}	—	October 7, 2008	Kitt Peak	Spacewatch	·	620 m	MPC · JPL

== 684501–684600 ==
back to top

Designation			Discovery			Properties		Ref
Permanent	Provisional	Named after	Date	Site	Discoverer(s)	Category	Diam.	Ref
684501	2008 TY_{218}	—	October 1, 2008	Kitt Peak	Spacewatch	·	1.3 km	MPC · JPL
684502	2008 TO_{219}	—	October 1, 2008	Mount Lemmon	Mount Lemmon Survey	·	540 m	MPC · JPL
684503	2008 TV_{219}	—	October 8, 2008	Kitt Peak	Spacewatch	·	1.0 km	MPC · JPL
684504	2008 TE_{220}	—	October 10, 2008	Kitt Peak	Spacewatch	·	1.3 km	MPC · JPL
684505	2008 TT_{220}	—	October 8, 2008	Kitt Peak	Spacewatch	·	760 m	MPC · JPL
684506	2008 TN_{221}	—	October 2, 2008	Kitt Peak	Spacewatch	·	550 m	MPC · JPL
684507	2008 TC_{222}	—	October 8, 2008	Mount Lemmon	Mount Lemmon Survey	·	1.5 km	MPC · JPL
684508	2008 TQ_{222}	—	October 3, 2008	Kitt Peak	Spacewatch	·	860 m	MPC · JPL
684509	2008 TS_{222}	—	October 8, 2008	Mount Lemmon	Mount Lemmon Survey	(45637)	2.6 km	MPC · JPL
684510	2008 TH_{224}	—	October 8, 2008	Mount Lemmon	Mount Lemmon Survey	·	1.3 km	MPC · JPL
684511	2008 TZ_{224}	—	October 10, 2008	Mount Lemmon	Mount Lemmon Survey	·	1.0 km	MPC · JPL
684512	2008 TC_{225}	—	October 10, 2008	Kitt Peak	Spacewatch	MIS	1.7 km	MPC · JPL
684513	2008 TH_{226}	—	October 7, 2008	Mount Lemmon	Mount Lemmon Survey	·	2.1 km	MPC · JPL
684514	2008 TU_{228}	—	October 9, 2008	Mount Lemmon	Mount Lemmon Survey	·	660 m	MPC · JPL
684515	2008 TX_{230}	—	October 10, 2008	Kitt Peak	Spacewatch	·	1.2 km	MPC · JPL
684516	2008 TN_{231}	—	October 3, 2008	Mount Lemmon	Mount Lemmon Survey	·	1.2 km	MPC · JPL
684517	2008 TW_{231}	—	October 8, 2008	Mount Lemmon	Mount Lemmon Survey	·	1.3 km	MPC · JPL
684518	2008 TU_{232}	—	October 10, 2008	Kitt Peak	Spacewatch	·	1.1 km	MPC · JPL
684519	2008 TY_{232}	—	October 9, 2008	Mount Lemmon	Mount Lemmon Survey	L4	6.9 km	MPC · JPL
684520	2008 TC_{233}	—	October 10, 2008	Mount Lemmon	Mount Lemmon Survey	·	1.1 km	MPC · JPL
684521	2008 TN_{233}	—	October 8, 2008	Mount Lemmon	Mount Lemmon Survey	·	2.7 km	MPC · JPL
684522	2008 TO_{233}	—	October 3, 2008	Mount Lemmon	Mount Lemmon Survey	JUN	900 m	MPC · JPL
684523	2008 TB_{234}	—	October 9, 2008	Mount Lemmon	Mount Lemmon Survey	·	1.5 km	MPC · JPL
684524	2008 TO_{236}	—	March 15, 2007	Kitt Peak	Spacewatch	RAF	860 m	MPC · JPL
684525	2008 UA_{1}	—	October 20, 2008	Desert Moon	Stevens, B. L.	EUN	1.3 km	MPC · JPL
684526	2008 UW_{18}	—	September 22, 2008	Mount Lemmon	Mount Lemmon Survey	·	1.1 km	MPC · JPL
684527	2008 UA_{19}	—	September 26, 2008	Kitt Peak	Spacewatch	MAS	470 m	MPC · JPL
684528	2008 UJ_{21}	—	October 6, 2008	Kitt Peak	Spacewatch	HNS	880 m	MPC · JPL
684529	2008 UN_{26}	—	September 24, 2008	Kitt Peak	Spacewatch	·	1.0 km	MPC · JPL
684530	2008 UZ_{40}	—	October 20, 2008	Kitt Peak	Spacewatch	·	2.7 km	MPC · JPL
684531	2008 UT_{43}	—	October 20, 2008	Mount Lemmon	Mount Lemmon Survey	·	2.2 km	MPC · JPL
684532	2008 UW_{47}	—	September 22, 2008	Mount Lemmon	Mount Lemmon Survey	·	1.8 km	MPC · JPL
684533	2008 UD_{70}	—	October 21, 2008	Mount Lemmon	Mount Lemmon Survey	·	1.1 km	MPC · JPL
684534	2008 UT_{72}	—	October 21, 2008	Mount Lemmon	Mount Lemmon Survey	·	3.2 km	MPC · JPL
684535	2008 UV_{72}	—	October 21, 2008	Kitt Peak	Spacewatch	·	2.9 km	MPC · JPL
684536	2008 UA_{74}	—	October 21, 2008	Kitt Peak	Spacewatch	TIR	2.5 km	MPC · JPL
684537	2008 UV_{79}	—	September 29, 2008	Mount Lemmon	Mount Lemmon Survey	·	1.8 km	MPC · JPL
684538	2008 UF_{80}	—	October 22, 2008	Kitt Peak	Spacewatch	·	1.3 km	MPC · JPL
684539	2008 UZ_{80}	—	October 22, 2008	Mount Lemmon	Mount Lemmon Survey	·	2.1 km	MPC · JPL
684540	2008 UG_{83}	—	October 22, 2008	Mount Lemmon	Mount Lemmon Survey	·	2.6 km	MPC · JPL
684541	2008 UL_{85}	—	September 9, 2008	Mount Lemmon	Mount Lemmon Survey	PAD	1.1 km	MPC · JPL
684542	2008 US_{85}	—	October 23, 2008	Mount Lemmon	Mount Lemmon Survey	AGN	810 m	MPC · JPL
684543	2008 UH_{86}	—	October 23, 2008	Kitt Peak	Spacewatch	·	550 m	MPC · JPL
684544	2008 UF_{96}	—	September 24, 2008	Mount Lemmon	Mount Lemmon Survey	LIX	3.7 km	MPC · JPL
684545	2008 UN_{97}	—	October 29, 2008	Mount Lemmon	Mount Lemmon Survey	·	2.4 km	MPC · JPL
684546	2008 UP_{99}	—	October 30, 2008	Mount Lemmon	Mount Lemmon Survey	ADE	2.0 km	MPC · JPL
684547	2008 UE_{104}	—	October 20, 2008	Mount Lemmon	Mount Lemmon Survey	·	510 m	MPC · JPL
684548	2008 UK_{105}	—	October 20, 2008	Mount Lemmon	Mount Lemmon Survey	GEF	970 m	MPC · JPL
684549	2008 UL_{107}	—	April 18, 2007	Kitt Peak	Spacewatch	·	1.5 km	MPC · JPL
684550	2008 UN_{107}	—	October 8, 2008	Catalina	CSS	·	2.3 km	MPC · JPL
684551	2008 UE_{108}	—	October 7, 2008	Mount Lemmon	Mount Lemmon Survey	·	2.5 km	MPC · JPL
684552	2008 UW_{111}	—	September 24, 2008	Kitt Peak	Spacewatch	·	2.6 km	MPC · JPL
684553	2008 UF_{114}	—	October 22, 2008	Kitt Peak	Spacewatch	·	690 m	MPC · JPL
684554	2008 UZ_{117}	—	October 22, 2008	Kitt Peak	Spacewatch	EOS	1.6 km	MPC · JPL
684555	2008 UF_{119}	—	October 22, 2008	Kitt Peak	Spacewatch	·	1.6 km	MPC · JPL
684556	2008 UF_{121}	—	October 22, 2008	Kitt Peak	Spacewatch	·	560 m	MPC · JPL
684557	2008 UO_{121}	—	October 22, 2008	Kitt Peak	Spacewatch	·	2.6 km	MPC · JPL
684558	2008 UO_{123}	—	October 22, 2008	Kitt Peak	Spacewatch	EOS	2.3 km	MPC · JPL
684559	2008 UJ_{129}	—	October 1, 2008	Mount Lemmon	Mount Lemmon Survey	·	1.2 km	MPC · JPL
684560	2008 UO_{131}	—	October 23, 2008	Kitt Peak	Spacewatch	·	520 m	MPC · JPL
684561	2008 UY_{133}	—	October 23, 2008	Kitt Peak	Spacewatch	(1338) (FLO)	500 m	MPC · JPL
684562	2008 UV_{150}	—	October 23, 2008	Mount Lemmon	Mount Lemmon Survey	·	1.4 km	MPC · JPL
684563	2008 UW_{151}	—	October 23, 2008	Mount Lemmon	Mount Lemmon Survey	·	1.3 km	MPC · JPL
684564	2008 US_{155}	—	October 23, 2008	Mount Lemmon	Mount Lemmon Survey	EOS	1.6 km	MPC · JPL
684565	2008 UT_{157}	—	October 23, 2008	Mount Lemmon	Mount Lemmon Survey	·	1.3 km	MPC · JPL
684566	2008 UC_{160}	—	October 23, 2008	Kitt Peak	Spacewatch	·	2.2 km	MPC · JPL
684567	2008 UR_{162}	—	October 10, 2008	Mount Lemmon	Mount Lemmon Survey	·	1.5 km	MPC · JPL
684568	2008 UZ_{165}	—	October 20, 2008	Kitt Peak	Spacewatch	·	1.3 km	MPC · JPL
684569	2008 UO_{168}	—	October 24, 2008	Kitt Peak	Spacewatch	·	620 m	MPC · JPL
684570	2008 UL_{173}	—	October 2, 2008	Mount Lemmon	Mount Lemmon Survey	·	1.2 km	MPC · JPL
684571	2008 UA_{176}	—	October 24, 2008	Mount Lemmon	Mount Lemmon Survey	·	510 m	MPC · JPL
684572	2008 UB_{181}	—	October 3, 2008	Mount Lemmon	Mount Lemmon Survey	·	1.5 km	MPC · JPL
684573	2008 UM_{183}	—	October 2, 2008	Kitt Peak	Spacewatch	·	1.3 km	MPC · JPL
684574	2008 UT_{192}	—	September 23, 2008	Kitt Peak	Spacewatch	·	2.5 km	MPC · JPL
684575	2008 UW_{192}	—	August 25, 2003	Cerro Tololo	Deep Ecliptic Survey	·	1.3 km	MPC · JPL
684576	2008 UK_{196}	—	October 27, 2008	Kitt Peak	Spacewatch	·	2.5 km	MPC · JPL
684577	2008 UP_{206}	—	October 4, 2008	Mount Lemmon	Mount Lemmon Survey	·	1.7 km	MPC · JPL
684578	2008 UW_{206}	—	June 9, 2008	Kitt Peak	Spacewatch	·	1.1 km	MPC · JPL
684579	2008 UZ_{209}	—	October 23, 2008	Kitt Peak	Spacewatch	·	1.4 km	MPC · JPL
684580	2008 UG_{215}	—	September 13, 2002	Palomar	NEAT	·	3.1 km	MPC · JPL
684581	2008 UV_{215}	—	October 24, 2008	Kitt Peak	Spacewatch	ERI	1.1 km	MPC · JPL
684582	2008 UW_{216}	—	September 2, 2008	Kitt Peak	Spacewatch	·	1.1 km	MPC · JPL
684583	2008 UH_{218}	—	October 21, 2008	Kitt Peak	Spacewatch	·	1.5 km	MPC · JPL
684584	2008 UG_{219}	—	October 25, 2008	Kitt Peak	Spacewatch	EUN	1.1 km	MPC · JPL
684585	2008 UH_{222}	—	October 25, 2008	Kitt Peak	Spacewatch	·	1.3 km	MPC · JPL
684586	2008 UT_{224}	—	October 25, 2008	Kitt Peak	Spacewatch	DOR	1.6 km	MPC · JPL
684587	2008 UP_{225}	—	October 25, 2008	Kitt Peak	Spacewatch	·	1.7 km	MPC · JPL
684588	2008 UB_{228}	—	October 25, 2008	Mount Lemmon	Mount Lemmon Survey	·	1.3 km	MPC · JPL
684589	2008 UB_{233}	—	November 30, 2005	Mount Lemmon	Mount Lemmon Survey	·	570 m	MPC · JPL
684590	2008 UE_{233}	—	October 26, 2008	Mount Lemmon	Mount Lemmon Survey	EUN	1.1 km	MPC · JPL
684591	2008 UZ_{236}	—	October 26, 2008	Kitt Peak	Spacewatch	·	810 m	MPC · JPL
684592	2008 UM_{242}	—	October 26, 2008	Kitt Peak	Spacewatch	·	2.7 km	MPC · JPL
684593	2008 UY_{245}	—	October 26, 2008	Kitt Peak	Spacewatch	·	2.7 km	MPC · JPL
684594	2008 UF_{248}	—	October 26, 2008	Kitt Peak	Spacewatch	·	3.1 km	MPC · JPL
684595	2008 UF_{250}	—	October 27, 2008	Kitt Peak	Spacewatch	·	2.3 km	MPC · JPL
684596	2008 UO_{250}	—	September 22, 2008	Mount Lemmon	Mount Lemmon Survey	·	3.3 km	MPC · JPL
684597	2008 UD_{251}	—	July 20, 2002	Palomar	NEAT	EOS	1.9 km	MPC · JPL
684598	2008 UE_{253}	—	October 3, 2008	Mount Lemmon	Mount Lemmon Survey	·	2.3 km	MPC · JPL
684599	2008 UL_{260}	—	October 27, 2008	Mount Lemmon	Mount Lemmon Survey	·	1.4 km	MPC · JPL
684600	2008 UK_{261}	—	October 9, 2008	Mount Lemmon	Mount Lemmon Survey	·	3.0 km	MPC · JPL

== 684601–684700 ==
back to top

Designation			Discovery			Properties		Ref
Permanent	Provisional	Named after	Date	Site	Discoverer(s)	Category	Diam.	Ref
684601	2008 UL_{262}	—	October 27, 2008	Kitt Peak	Spacewatch	·	3.0 km	MPC · JPL
684602	2008 UM_{262}	—	October 27, 2008	Kitt Peak	Spacewatch	·	730 m	MPC · JPL
684603	2008 UN_{265}	—	October 28, 2008	Kitt Peak	Spacewatch	·	2.9 km	MPC · JPL
684604	2008 UG_{266}	—	October 9, 2008	Kitt Peak	Spacewatch	·	1.3 km	MPC · JPL
684605	2008 UR_{269}	—	October 20, 2008	Kitt Peak	Spacewatch	·	2.7 km	MPC · JPL
684606	2008 US_{270}	—	October 28, 2008	Kitt Peak	Spacewatch	·	1.4 km	MPC · JPL
684607	2008 UM_{271}	—	October 28, 2008	Kitt Peak	Spacewatch	·	730 m	MPC · JPL
684608	2008 UN_{272}	—	October 28, 2008	Mount Lemmon	Mount Lemmon Survey	HNS	960 m	MPC · JPL
684609	2008 UE_{273}	—	November 19, 2003	Kitt Peak	Spacewatch	·	2.7 km	MPC · JPL
684610	2008 UC_{274}	—	October 28, 2008	Kitt Peak	Spacewatch	·	2.4 km	MPC · JPL
684611	2008 UG_{276}	—	October 25, 2003	Kitt Peak	Spacewatch	KOR	1.1 km	MPC · JPL
684612	2008 UC_{279}	—	October 28, 2008	Mount Lemmon	Mount Lemmon Survey	·	2.0 km	MPC · JPL
684613	2008 UW_{280}	—	September 11, 2002	Palomar	NEAT	·	3.3 km	MPC · JPL
684614	2008 UA_{284}	—	September 25, 2008	Kitt Peak	Spacewatch	·	2.1 km	MPC · JPL
684615	2008 UL_{287}	—	October 28, 2008	Mount Lemmon	Mount Lemmon Survey	(29841)	1.1 km	MPC · JPL
684616	2008 UW_{293}	—	September 28, 2008	Mount Lemmon	Mount Lemmon Survey	MRX	820 m	MPC · JPL
684617	2008 UK_{294}	—	October 29, 2008	Kitt Peak	Spacewatch	·	1.1 km	MPC · JPL
684618	2008 UD_{301}	—	October 21, 2008	Kitt Peak	Spacewatch	EOS	2.2 km	MPC · JPL
684619	2008 UK_{311}	—	October 30, 2008	Kitt Peak	Spacewatch	·	2.4 km	MPC · JPL
684620	2008 UY_{311}	—	October 30, 2008	Kitt Peak	Spacewatch	·	2.8 km	MPC · JPL
684621	2008 UN_{318}	—	October 10, 2008	Mount Lemmon	Mount Lemmon Survey	·	1.8 km	MPC · JPL
684622	2008 UG_{326}	—	October 31, 2008	Mount Lemmon	Mount Lemmon Survey	VER	2.5 km	MPC · JPL
684623	2008 UD_{329}	—	September 29, 2008	Mount Lemmon	Mount Lemmon Survey	·	1.1 km	MPC · JPL
684624	2008 UE_{329}	—	October 30, 2008	Mount Lemmon	Mount Lemmon Survey	·	1.2 km	MPC · JPL
684625	2008 UA_{330}	—	October 31, 2008	Kitt Peak	Spacewatch	·	1.2 km	MPC · JPL
684626	2008 UO_{330}	—	October 23, 2008	Kitt Peak	Spacewatch	·	1.8 km	MPC · JPL
684627	2008 UD_{331}	—	November 10, 2004	Kitt Peak	Spacewatch	·	1.3 km	MPC · JPL
684628	2008 UP_{340}	—	October 24, 2008	Kitt Peak	Spacewatch	·	2.2 km	MPC · JPL
684629	2008 UX_{350}	—	October 24, 2008	Kitt Peak	Spacewatch	·	1.1 km	MPC · JPL
684630	2008 UY_{350}	—	October 24, 2008	Kitt Peak	Spacewatch	EMA	2.7 km	MPC · JPL
684631	2008 UH_{356}	—	October 22, 2008	Kitt Peak	Spacewatch	·	3.0 km	MPC · JPL
684632	2008 UD_{359}	—	October 27, 2008	Mount Lemmon	Mount Lemmon Survey	·	600 m	MPC · JPL
684633	2008 UE_{363}	—	October 1, 2008	Catalina	CSS	·	1.5 km	MPC · JPL
684634	2008 UD_{365}	—	September 19, 1995	Kitt Peak	Spacewatch	EUN	1.0 km	MPC · JPL
684635	2008 UZ_{365}	—	October 24, 2008	Catalina	CSS	·	3.4 km	MPC · JPL
684636	2008 UC_{366}	—	October 8, 2008	Mount Lemmon	Mount Lemmon Survey	·	1.2 km	MPC · JPL
684637	2008 UA_{367}	—	October 24, 2008	Socorro	LINEAR	·	1.7 km	MPC · JPL
684638	2008 UE_{375}	—	September 23, 2008	Kitt Peak	Spacewatch	·	1.9 km	MPC · JPL
684639	2008 UJ_{375}	—	May 4, 2005	Mauna Kea	Veillet, C.	THM	2.1 km	MPC · JPL
684640	2008 UU_{375}	—	October 28, 2008	Kitt Peak	Spacewatch	PHO	840 m	MPC · JPL
684641	2008 UD_{377}	—	October 25, 2008	Catalina	CSS	·	1.8 km	MPC · JPL
684642	2008 UX_{377}	—	May 14, 2001	Kitt Peak	Spacewatch	·	2.0 km	MPC · JPL
684643	2008 UZ_{377}	—	September 26, 2017	Haleakala	Pan-STARRS 1	·	1.3 km	MPC · JPL
684644	2008 UK_{379}	—	October 25, 2008	Mount Lemmon	Mount Lemmon Survey	HYG	2.6 km	MPC · JPL
684645	2008 UH_{380}	—	October 25, 2008	Mount Lemmon	Mount Lemmon Survey	·	1.3 km	MPC · JPL
684646	2008 UF_{381}	—	April 1, 2011	Kitt Peak	Spacewatch	·	1.3 km	MPC · JPL
684647	2008 UT_{381}	—	March 17, 2015	Haleakala	Pan-STARRS 1	·	1.2 km	MPC · JPL
684648	2008 UQ_{382}	—	February 17, 2010	Mount Lemmon	Mount Lemmon Survey	·	1.4 km	MPC · JPL
684649	2008 UU_{382}	—	June 8, 2016	Haleakala	Pan-STARRS 1	·	1.4 km	MPC · JPL
684650	2008 UF_{384}	—	October 3, 2008	Kitt Peak	Spacewatch	·	710 m	MPC · JPL
684651	2008 UN_{384}	—	October 22, 2008	Kitt Peak	Spacewatch	·	1.1 km	MPC · JPL
684652	2008 UR_{384}	—	October 21, 2008	Kitt Peak	Spacewatch	PHO	600 m	MPC · JPL
684653	2008 UX_{386}	—	May 27, 2012	Mount Lemmon	Mount Lemmon Survey	·	2.3 km	MPC · JPL
684654	2008 UK_{388}	—	December 6, 2013	Haleakala	Pan-STARRS 1	·	1.7 km	MPC · JPL
684655	2008 UT_{388}	—	June 3, 2016	Haleakala	Pan-STARRS 1	H	460 m	MPC · JPL
684656	2008 UE_{389}	—	October 27, 2008	Kitt Peak	Spacewatch	·	2.3 km	MPC · JPL
684657	2008 UJ_{389}	—	May 21, 2017	Haleakala	Pan-STARRS 1	EMA	2.7 km	MPC · JPL
684658	2008 UT_{391}	—	September 26, 2017	Haleakala	Pan-STARRS 1	·	1.5 km	MPC · JPL
684659	2008 UD_{392}	—	November 28, 2013	Mount Lemmon	Mount Lemmon Survey	·	1.6 km	MPC · JPL
684660	2008 UN_{392}	—	January 9, 2016	Haleakala	Pan-STARRS 1	EOS	1.8 km	MPC · JPL
684661	2008 UQ_{395}	—	March 9, 2011	Mount Lemmon	Mount Lemmon Survey	·	2.7 km	MPC · JPL
684662	2008 UD_{397}	—	October 13, 2017	Mount Lemmon	Mount Lemmon Survey	·	1.7 km	MPC · JPL
684663	2008 UV_{397}	—	October 24, 2008	Kitt Peak	Spacewatch	·	640 m	MPC · JPL
684664	2008 UD_{398}	—	October 28, 2008	Kitt Peak	Spacewatch	·	1 km	MPC · JPL
684665	2008 UZ_{400}	—	February 14, 2010	Mount Lemmon	Mount Lemmon Survey	·	1.2 km	MPC · JPL
684666	2008 UP_{401}	—	July 7, 2016	Haleakala	Pan-STARRS 1	·	1.2 km	MPC · JPL
684667	2008 UF_{403}	—	October 30, 2008	Mount Lemmon	Mount Lemmon Survey	·	1.2 km	MPC · JPL
684668	2008 UO_{406}	—	October 20, 2008	Mount Lemmon	Mount Lemmon Survey	·	1.2 km	MPC · JPL
684669	2008 UD_{409}	—	October 27, 2008	Mount Lemmon	Mount Lemmon Survey	·	1.4 km	MPC · JPL
684670	2008 UW_{409}	—	October 27, 2008	Kitt Peak	Spacewatch	DOR	1.7 km	MPC · JPL
684671	2008 UD_{412}	—	October 27, 2008	Mount Lemmon	Mount Lemmon Survey	·	1.3 km	MPC · JPL
684672	2008 UT_{413}	—	October 29, 2008	Mount Lemmon	Mount Lemmon Survey	·	790 m	MPC · JPL
684673	2008 UG_{418}	—	October 26, 2008	Mount Lemmon	Mount Lemmon Survey	·	1.1 km	MPC · JPL
684674	2008 UJ_{419}	—	October 30, 2008	Mount Lemmon	Mount Lemmon Survey	·	1.4 km	MPC · JPL
684675	2008 UM_{419}	—	October 28, 2008	Kitt Peak	Spacewatch	WIT	710 m	MPC · JPL
684676	2008 UP_{419}	—	October 27, 2008	Mount Lemmon	Mount Lemmon Survey	MIS	2.1 km	MPC · JPL
684677	2008 UX_{421}	—	October 25, 2008	Kitt Peak	Spacewatch	·	1.4 km	MPC · JPL
684678	2008 VQ	—	October 26, 2008	Mount Lemmon	Mount Lemmon Survey	·	1.5 km	MPC · JPL
684679	2008 VJ_{6}	—	October 25, 2008	Kitt Peak	Spacewatch	·	3.2 km	MPC · JPL
684680	2008 VB_{8}	—	September 29, 2008	Mount Lemmon	Mount Lemmon Survey	·	3.6 km	MPC · JPL
684681	2008 VJ_{10}	—	November 2, 2008	Kitt Peak	Spacewatch	·	1.5 km	MPC · JPL
684682	2008 VF_{16}	—	November 1, 2008	Kitt Peak	Spacewatch	·	520 m	MPC · JPL
684683	2008 VA_{21}	—	October 6, 2008	Mount Lemmon	Mount Lemmon Survey	·	1.2 km	MPC · JPL
684684	2008 VH_{23}	—	November 1, 2008	Kitt Peak	Spacewatch	·	610 m	MPC · JPL
684685	2008 VG_{25}	—	November 2, 2008	Kitt Peak	Spacewatch	V	490 m	MPC · JPL
684686	2008 VS_{32}	—	November 2, 2008	Mount Lemmon	Mount Lemmon Survey	(5)	1.0 km	MPC · JPL
684687	2008 VW_{40}	—	November 3, 2008	Kitt Peak	Spacewatch	VER	2.0 km	MPC · JPL
684688	2008 VS_{47}	—	November 3, 2008	Mount Lemmon	Mount Lemmon Survey	·	2.4 km	MPC · JPL
684689	2008 VO_{60}	—	November 7, 2008	Mount Lemmon	Mount Lemmon Survey	·	580 m	MPC · JPL
684690	2008 VM_{63}	—	November 8, 2008	Kitt Peak	Spacewatch	·	710 m	MPC · JPL
684691	2008 VU_{69}	—	November 2, 2008	Kitt Peak	Spacewatch	EOS	1.7 km	MPC · JPL
684692	2008 VB_{71}	—	November 9, 2008	Kitt Peak	Spacewatch	·	1.4 km	MPC · JPL
684693	2008 VT_{78}	—	November 8, 2008	Mount Lemmon	Mount Lemmon Survey	KOR	1.0 km	MPC · JPL
684694	2008 VL_{81}	—	September 3, 2008	Kitt Peak	Spacewatch	·	2.8 km	MPC · JPL
684695	2008 VG_{82}	—	November 6, 2008	Mount Lemmon	Mount Lemmon Survey	·	1.1 km	MPC · JPL
684696	2008 VK_{82}	—	November 1, 2008	Mount Lemmon	Mount Lemmon Survey	·	1.4 km	MPC · JPL
684697	2008 VU_{83}	—	April 1, 2015	Haleakala	Pan-STARRS 1	·	1.2 km	MPC · JPL
684698	2008 VT_{84}	—	November 9, 2008	Kitt Peak	Spacewatch	·	1.4 km	MPC · JPL
684699	2008 VY_{84}	—	April 30, 2011	Haleakala	Pan-STARRS 1	·	1.4 km	MPC · JPL
684700	2008 VQ_{85}	—	November 7, 2008	Mount Lemmon	Mount Lemmon Survey	·	1.5 km	MPC · JPL

== 684701–684800 ==
back to top

Designation			Discovery			Properties		Ref
Permanent	Provisional	Named after	Date	Site	Discoverer(s)	Category	Diam.	Ref
684701	2008 VY_{85}	—	April 10, 2014	Haleakala	Pan-STARRS 1	·	1.0 km	MPC · JPL
684702	2008 VF_{86}	—	December 24, 2013	Mount Lemmon	Mount Lemmon Survey	NEM	1.7 km	MPC · JPL
684703	2008 VH_{86}	—	June 7, 2016	Haleakala	Pan-STARRS 1	·	1.4 km	MPC · JPL
684704	2008 VF_{87}	—	May 13, 2007	Kitt Peak	Spacewatch	·	1.1 km	MPC · JPL
684705	2008 VC_{89}	—	November 7, 2008	Catalina	CSS	·	4.0 km	MPC · JPL
684706	2008 VG_{89}	—	February 4, 2016	Haleakala	Pan-STARRS 1	VER	2.6 km	MPC · JPL
684707	2008 VK_{89}	—	November 8, 2008	Kitt Peak	Spacewatch	·	1.4 km	MPC · JPL
684708	2008 VX_{89}	—	September 6, 2013	Mount Lemmon	Mount Lemmon Survey	·	2.3 km	MPC · JPL
684709	2008 VM_{92}	—	November 2, 2008	Mount Lemmon	Mount Lemmon Survey	·	1.5 km	MPC · JPL
684710	2008 VZ_{94}	—	October 3, 2014	Mount Lemmon	Mount Lemmon Survey	·	2.6 km	MPC · JPL
684711	2008 VK_{95}	—	October 21, 2017	Mount Lemmon	Mount Lemmon Survey	·	1.5 km	MPC · JPL
684712	2008 VU_{96}	—	November 1, 2008	Mount Lemmon	Mount Lemmon Survey	·	2.8 km	MPC · JPL
684713	2008 VM_{99}	—	November 1, 2008	Mount Lemmon	Mount Lemmon Survey	(17392)	1.1 km	MPC · JPL
684714	2008 VO_{99}	—	November 3, 2008	Kitt Peak	Spacewatch	MAS	530 m	MPC · JPL
684715	2008 VH_{100}	—	November 2, 2008	Kitt Peak	Spacewatch	·	1.3 km	MPC · JPL
684716	2008 VP_{102}	—	November 7, 2008	Mount Lemmon	Mount Lemmon Survey	V	390 m	MPC · JPL
684717	2008 VT_{105}	—	November 9, 2008	Kitt Peak	Spacewatch	·	1.1 km	MPC · JPL
684718	2008 VE_{106}	—	November 6, 2008	Kitt Peak	Spacewatch	·	1.4 km	MPC · JPL
684719	2008 VP_{106}	—	November 1, 2008	Mount Lemmon	Mount Lemmon Survey	SYL	3.0 km	MPC · JPL
684720	2008 VH_{107}	—	September 6, 2008	Catalina	CSS	3:2	5.4 km	MPC · JPL
684721	2008 VC_{109}	—	November 1, 2008	Mount Lemmon	Mount Lemmon Survey	AGN	940 m	MPC · JPL
684722	2008 WZ_{4}	—	October 1, 2008	Mount Lemmon	Mount Lemmon Survey	·	2.2 km	MPC · JPL
684723	2008 WE_{6}	—	September 28, 2008	Mount Lemmon	Mount Lemmon Survey	·	1.2 km	MPC · JPL
684724	2008 WN_{6}	—	November 17, 2008	Kitt Peak	Spacewatch	·	670 m	MPC · JPL
684725	2008 WT_{6}	—	October 1, 2008	Mount Lemmon	Mount Lemmon Survey	·	2.9 km	MPC · JPL
684726	2008 WZ_{6}	—	November 17, 2008	Kitt Peak	Spacewatch	·	1.2 km	MPC · JPL
684727	2008 WP_{15}	—	October 7, 2008	Kitt Peak	Spacewatch	·	1.2 km	MPC · JPL
684728	2008 WZ_{15}	—	September 15, 2004	Kitt Peak	Spacewatch	·	910 m	MPC · JPL
684729	2008 WE_{18}	—	November 17, 2008	Kitt Peak	Spacewatch	·	2.2 km	MPC · JPL
684730	2008 WO_{21}	—	November 17, 2008	Kitt Peak	Spacewatch	·	1.5 km	MPC · JPL
684731	2008 WM_{22}	—	October 10, 2008	Mount Lemmon	Mount Lemmon Survey	·	1.5 km	MPC · JPL
684732	2008 WJ_{26}	—	November 19, 2008	Kitt Peak	Spacewatch	·	480 m	MPC · JPL
684733	2008 WW_{28}	—	October 27, 2008	Mount Lemmon	Mount Lemmon Survey	·	1.4 km	MPC · JPL
684734	2008 WO_{29}	—	November 19, 2008	Kitt Peak	Spacewatch	·	1.7 km	MPC · JPL
684735	2008 WS_{34}	—	October 20, 2008	Kitt Peak	Spacewatch	·	590 m	MPC · JPL
684736	2008 WW_{34}	—	October 28, 2008	Mount Lemmon	Mount Lemmon Survey	·	2.5 km	MPC · JPL
684737	2008 WQ_{40}	—	November 9, 2008	Kitt Peak	Spacewatch	EUN	800 m	MPC · JPL
684738	2008 WA_{41}	—	September 12, 2007	Mount Lemmon	Mount Lemmon Survey	·	2.6 km	MPC · JPL
684739	2008 WZ_{42}	—	November 17, 2008	Kitt Peak	Spacewatch	·	820 m	MPC · JPL
684740	2008 WH_{49}	—	November 18, 2008	Kitt Peak	Spacewatch	·	2.4 km	MPC · JPL
684741	2008 WX_{50}	—	November 18, 2008	Kitt Peak	Spacewatch	·	2.0 km	MPC · JPL
684742	2008 WZ_{50}	—	November 18, 2008	Kitt Peak	Spacewatch	AST	1.3 km	MPC · JPL
684743	2008 WR_{52}	—	October 24, 2008	Bergisch Gladbach	W. Bickel	EOS	1.5 km	MPC · JPL
684744	2008 WV_{52}	—	November 19, 2008	Kitt Peak	Spacewatch	·	1.1 km	MPC · JPL
684745	2008 WJ_{57}	—	November 20, 2008	Mount Lemmon	Mount Lemmon Survey	·	2.2 km	MPC · JPL
684746	2008 WK_{58}	—	May 2, 2006	Mount Lemmon	Mount Lemmon Survey	·	2.1 km	MPC · JPL
684747	2008 WT_{63}	—	November 23, 2008	Calvin-Rehoboth	L. A. Molnar	·	2.7 km	MPC · JPL
684748	2008 WU_{68}	—	November 18, 2008	Kitt Peak	Spacewatch	EOS	1.8 km	MPC · JPL
684749	2008 WK_{72}	—	September 24, 2008	Mount Lemmon	Mount Lemmon Survey	DOR	2.6 km	MPC · JPL
684750	2008 WZ_{74}	—	November 6, 2008	Kitt Peak	Spacewatch	HNS	860 m	MPC · JPL
684751	2008 WY_{76}	—	November 20, 2008	Kitt Peak	Spacewatch	WIT	780 m	MPC · JPL
684752	2008 WR_{77}	—	November 20, 2008	Kitt Peak	Spacewatch	·	1.5 km	MPC · JPL
684753	2008 WA_{79}	—	October 25, 2008	Mount Lemmon	Mount Lemmon Survey	·	1.6 km	MPC · JPL
684754	2008 WA_{81}	—	November 7, 2008	Mount Lemmon	Mount Lemmon Survey	HYG	2.6 km	MPC · JPL
684755	2008 WE_{87}	—	October 1, 2008	Kitt Peak	Spacewatch	·	1.4 km	MPC · JPL
684756	2008 WQ_{100}	—	September 17, 2004	Kitt Peak	Spacewatch	MAS	840 m	MPC · JPL
684757	2008 WY_{100}	—	November 9, 2008	Mount Lemmon	Mount Lemmon Survey	·	1.8 km	MPC · JPL
684758	2008 WM_{104}	—	November 30, 2008	Mount Lemmon	Mount Lemmon Survey	·	1.3 km	MPC · JPL
684759	2008 WC_{107}	—	November 30, 2008	Kitt Peak	Spacewatch	·	1.6 km	MPC · JPL
684760	2008 WR_{115}	—	November 30, 2008	Kitt Peak	Spacewatch	·	640 m	MPC · JPL
684761	2008 WU_{116}	—	November 30, 2008	Kitt Peak	Spacewatch	·	1.4 km	MPC · JPL
684762	2008 WK_{118}	—	October 30, 2008	Kitt Peak	Spacewatch	·	690 m	MPC · JPL
684763	2008 WT_{119}	—	November 30, 2008	Mount Lemmon	Mount Lemmon Survey	EOS	1.7 km	MPC · JPL
684764	2008 WF_{120}	—	November 30, 2008	Kitt Peak	Spacewatch	·	640 m	MPC · JPL
684765	2008 WU_{127}	—	November 20, 2008	Kitt Peak	Spacewatch	·	1.4 km	MPC · JPL
684766	2008 WP_{134}	—	November 22, 2008	Mount Lemmon	Mount Lemmon Survey	·	1.9 km	MPC · JPL
684767	2008 WP_{141}	—	November 22, 2008	Mount Lemmon	Mount Lemmon Survey	·	1.5 km	MPC · JPL
684768	2008 WL_{143}	—	September 16, 2003	Kitt Peak	Spacewatch	·	1.5 km	MPC · JPL
684769	2008 WV_{143}	—	November 21, 2008	Kitt Peak	Spacewatch	WIT	750 m	MPC · JPL
684770	2008 WZ_{143}	—	November 18, 2008	Kitt Peak	Spacewatch	·	960 m	MPC · JPL
684771	2008 WO_{144}	—	August 29, 2011	Siding Spring	SSS	·	870 m	MPC · JPL
684772	2008 WJ_{145}	—	January 17, 2013	Haleakala	Pan-STARRS 1	V	500 m	MPC · JPL
684773	2008 WV_{145}	—	November 6, 2012	Mount Lemmon	Mount Lemmon Survey	·	1.2 km	MPC · JPL
684774	2008 WE_{146}	—	October 9, 2012	Mount Lemmon	Mount Lemmon Survey	·	1.4 km	MPC · JPL
684775	2008 WO_{146}	—	November 19, 2008	Mount Lemmon	Mount Lemmon Survey	·	820 m	MPC · JPL
684776	2008 WP_{148}	—	November 24, 2008	Mount Lemmon	Mount Lemmon Survey	·	780 m	MPC · JPL
684777	2008 WS_{148}	—	November 30, 2008	Mount Lemmon	Mount Lemmon Survey	·	2.6 km	MPC · JPL
684778	2008 WB_{149}	—	September 9, 2013	Haleakala	Pan-STARRS 1	THM	2.2 km	MPC · JPL
684779	2008 WQ_{150}	—	June 19, 2015	Haleakala	Pan-STARRS 1	·	1.5 km	MPC · JPL
684780	2008 WQ_{151}	—	November 21, 2008	Mount Lemmon	Mount Lemmon Survey	H	420 m	MPC · JPL
684781	2008 WW_{152}	—	October 3, 2014	Mount Lemmon	Mount Lemmon Survey	·	3.0 km	MPC · JPL
684782	2008 WZ_{152}	—	August 1, 2016	Haleakala	Pan-STARRS 1	·	1.2 km	MPC · JPL
684783	2008 WT_{155}	—	November 11, 1996	Kitt Peak	Spacewatch	·	2.7 km	MPC · JPL
684784	2008 WF_{156}	—	November 24, 2008	Mount Lemmon	Mount Lemmon Survey	·	3.4 km	MPC · JPL
684785	2008 WD_{157}	—	November 19, 2008	Kitt Peak	Spacewatch	V	410 m	MPC · JPL
684786	2008 WU_{157}	—	November 20, 2008	Kitt Peak	Spacewatch	·	1.4 km	MPC · JPL
684787	2008 WJ_{158}	—	November 20, 2008	Kitt Peak	Spacewatch	·	1.7 km	MPC · JPL
684788	2008 WZ_{158}	—	November 19, 2008	Kitt Peak	Spacewatch	·	1.5 km	MPC · JPL
684789	2008 WO_{159}	—	November 21, 2008	Mount Lemmon	Mount Lemmon Survey	·	3.4 km	MPC · JPL
684790	2008 WM_{161}	—	November 19, 2008	Mount Lemmon	Mount Lemmon Survey	·	1.1 km	MPC · JPL
684791	2008 WN_{162}	—	November 18, 2008	Kitt Peak	Spacewatch	·	2.2 km	MPC · JPL
684792	2008 WU_{163}	—	November 18, 2008	Kitt Peak	Spacewatch	·	1.3 km	MPC · JPL
684793	2008 WL_{164}	—	November 22, 2008	Kitt Peak	Spacewatch	·	1.3 km	MPC · JPL
684794	2008 WQ_{164}	—	November 19, 2008	Kitt Peak	Spacewatch	·	1.4 km	MPC · JPL
684795	2008 XM_{6}	—	November 23, 2008	Catalina	CSS	·	1.9 km	MPC · JPL
684796	2008 XN_{8}	—	September 18, 2003	Kitt Peak	Spacewatch	·	1.6 km	MPC · JPL
684797	2008 XQ_{23}	—	December 4, 2008	Mount Lemmon	Mount Lemmon Survey	·	1.4 km	MPC · JPL
684798	2008 XW_{25}	—	September 7, 2008	Mount Lemmon	Mount Lemmon Survey	·	1.5 km	MPC · JPL
684799	2008 XL_{27}	—	December 4, 2008	Mount Lemmon	Mount Lemmon Survey	·	1.4 km	MPC · JPL
684800	2008 XU_{27}	—	December 4, 2008	Mount Lemmon	Mount Lemmon Survey	·	2.3 km	MPC · JPL

== 684801–684900 ==
back to top

Designation			Discovery			Properties		Ref
Permanent	Provisional	Named after	Date	Site	Discoverer(s)	Category	Diam.	Ref
684801	2008 XE_{33}	—	December 2, 2008	Kitt Peak	Spacewatch	·	760 m	MPC · JPL
684802	2008 XM_{37}	—	November 19, 2008	Mount Lemmon	Mount Lemmon Survey	·	1.3 km	MPC · JPL
684803	2008 XB_{39}	—	December 2, 2008	Kitt Peak	Spacewatch	·	1.3 km	MPC · JPL
684804	2008 XT_{45}	—	October 25, 2008	Kitt Peak	Spacewatch	(2076)	750 m	MPC · JPL
684805	2008 XY_{45}	—	December 4, 2008	Mount Lemmon	Mount Lemmon Survey	·	1.2 km	MPC · JPL
684806	2008 XH_{46}	—	November 7, 2008	Mount Lemmon	Mount Lemmon Survey	·	1.8 km	MPC · JPL
684807	2008 XP_{51}	—	December 4, 2008	Kitt Peak	Spacewatch	THM	2.1 km	MPC · JPL
684808	2008 XA_{52}	—	October 28, 2008	Kitt Peak	Spacewatch	·	1.7 km	MPC · JPL
684809	2008 XT_{58}	—	December 1, 2008	Kitt Peak	Spacewatch	·	640 m	MPC · JPL
684810	2008 XM_{60}	—	August 7, 2016	Haleakala	Pan-STARRS 1	·	1.7 km	MPC · JPL
684811	2008 XJ_{61}	—	December 2, 2008	Kitt Peak	Spacewatch	·	1.2 km	MPC · JPL
684812	2008 XN_{61}	—	April 28, 2011	Haleakala	Pan-STARRS 1	·	2.5 km	MPC · JPL
684813	2008 XE_{62}	—	October 16, 2012	Mount Lemmon	Mount Lemmon Survey	·	1.8 km	MPC · JPL
684814	2008 XL_{62}	—	April 18, 2015	Cerro Tololo-DECam	DECam	·	1.5 km	MPC · JPL
684815	2008 XB_{63}	—	January 4, 2014	Mount Lemmon	Mount Lemmon Survey	·	1.5 km	MPC · JPL
684816	2008 XE_{63}	—	December 3, 2008	Mount Lemmon	Mount Lemmon Survey	·	1.4 km	MPC · JPL
684817	2008 XT_{63}	—	December 5, 2008	Kitt Peak	Spacewatch	ADE	1.7 km	MPC · JPL
684818	2008 XD_{65}	—	November 21, 2014	Haleakala	Pan-STARRS 1	·	2.8 km	MPC · JPL
684819	2008 XK_{65}	—	September 26, 2011	Haleakala	Pan-STARRS 1	·	680 m	MPC · JPL
684820	2008 XS_{65}	—	December 1, 2008	Kitt Peak	Spacewatch	·	1.9 km	MPC · JPL
684821	2008 XV_{66}	—	December 4, 2008	Mount Lemmon	Mount Lemmon Survey	·	1.7 km	MPC · JPL
684822	2008 XJ_{68}	—	December 4, 2008	Kitt Peak	Spacewatch	NEM	2.0 km	MPC · JPL
684823	2008 YW_{3}	—	December 21, 2008	Dauban	C. Rinner, Kugel, F.	·	780 m	MPC · JPL
684824	2008 YU_{4}	—	December 22, 2008	Dauban	C. Rinner, Kugel, F.	EUN	1.8 km	MPC · JPL
684825	2008 YU_{7}	—	November 19, 2008	Kitt Peak	Spacewatch	·	1.2 km	MPC · JPL
684826	2008 YG_{9}	—	December 23, 2008	Nazaret	Muler, G.	(2076)	710 m	MPC · JPL
684827	2008 YR_{9}	—	November 7, 2008	Tzec Maun	L. Elenin	·	1.7 km	MPC · JPL
684828	2008 YP_{10}	—	October 27, 2008	Kitt Peak	Spacewatch	·	1.3 km	MPC · JPL
684829	2008 YW_{14}	—	December 1, 2008	Kitt Peak	Spacewatch	V	490 m	MPC · JPL
684830	2008 YQ_{16}	—	December 21, 2008	Mount Lemmon	Mount Lemmon Survey	·	2.1 km	MPC · JPL
684831	2008 YO_{20}	—	December 21, 2008	Mount Lemmon	Mount Lemmon Survey	·	1.5 km	MPC · JPL
684832	2008 YP_{20}	—	December 21, 2008	Mount Lemmon	Mount Lemmon Survey	DOR	1.6 km	MPC · JPL
684833	2008 YB_{25}	—	December 30, 2008	Kitt Peak	Spacewatch	·	3.9 km	MPC · JPL
684834	2008 YG_{31}	—	December 24, 2008	Weihai	University, Shandong	·	1.8 km	MPC · JPL
684835	2008 YW_{36}	—	December 22, 2008	Kitt Peak	Spacewatch	MAS	470 m	MPC · JPL
684836	2008 YX_{36}	—	December 22, 2008	Kitt Peak	Spacewatch	MAS	510 m	MPC · JPL
684837	2008 YM_{39}	—	December 29, 2008	Mount Lemmon	Mount Lemmon Survey	DOR	1.7 km	MPC · JPL
684838	2008 YU_{39}	—	September 10, 2007	Mount Lemmon	Mount Lemmon Survey	·	1.6 km	MPC · JPL
684839	2008 YK_{41}	—	December 29, 2008	Kitt Peak	Spacewatch	·	1.4 km	MPC · JPL
684840	2008 YK_{42}	—	December 29, 2008	Kitt Peak	Spacewatch	·	1.7 km	MPC · JPL
684841	2008 YF_{44}	—	February 2, 1995	Kitt Peak	Spacewatch	·	1.5 km	MPC · JPL
684842	2008 YN_{45}	—	December 29, 2008	Mount Lemmon	Mount Lemmon Survey	·	1.5 km	MPC · JPL
684843	2008 YV_{46}	—	October 10, 2007	Mount Lemmon	Mount Lemmon Survey	·	3.3 km	MPC · JPL
684844	2008 YJ_{47}	—	December 4, 2008	Mount Lemmon	Mount Lemmon Survey	·	1.8 km	MPC · JPL
684845	2008 YT_{52}	—	December 29, 2008	Mount Lemmon	Mount Lemmon Survey	·	2.7 km	MPC · JPL
684846	2008 YS_{55}	—	November 7, 2008	Mount Lemmon	Mount Lemmon Survey	DOR	2.0 km	MPC · JPL
684847	2008 YX_{57}	—	December 30, 2008	Kitt Peak	Spacewatch	·	710 m	MPC · JPL
684848	2008 YH_{59}	—	December 30, 2008	Kitt Peak	Spacewatch	·	590 m	MPC · JPL
684849	2008 YK_{59}	—	December 30, 2008	Kitt Peak	Spacewatch	·	2.3 km	MPC · JPL
684850	2008 YA_{62}	—	August 24, 2007	Kitt Peak	Spacewatch	·	1.1 km	MPC · JPL
684851	2008 YO_{62}	—	December 30, 2008	Mount Lemmon	Mount Lemmon Survey	AGN	1.1 km	MPC · JPL
684852	2008 YE_{63}	—	December 30, 2008	Mount Lemmon	Mount Lemmon Survey	EUN	1.2 km	MPC · JPL
684853	2008 YV_{64}	—	December 30, 2008	Mount Lemmon	Mount Lemmon Survey	·	840 m	MPC · JPL
684854	2008 YX_{66}	—	December 1, 2008	Kitt Peak	Spacewatch	·	1.6 km	MPC · JPL
684855	2008 YO_{67}	—	December 30, 2008	Mount Lemmon	Mount Lemmon Survey	·	1.7 km	MPC · JPL
684856	2008 YB_{68}	—	December 30, 2008	Mount Lemmon	Mount Lemmon Survey	WIT	920 m	MPC · JPL
684857	2008 YT_{69}	—	December 29, 2008	Mount Lemmon	Mount Lemmon Survey	·	1.3 km	MPC · JPL
684858	2008 YA_{70}	—	December 29, 2008	Mount Lemmon	Mount Lemmon Survey	·	1.6 km	MPC · JPL
684859	2008 YT_{72}	—	September 4, 2007	Mount Lemmon	Mount Lemmon Survey	·	1.4 km	MPC · JPL
684860	2008 YO_{74}	—	December 22, 2008	Kitt Peak	Spacewatch	·	1.6 km	MPC · JPL
684861	2008 YZ_{78}	—	September 12, 2007	Mount Lemmon	Mount Lemmon Survey	AGN	850 m	MPC · JPL
684862	2008 YW_{80}	—	March 10, 2005	Vicques	M. Ory	MIS	2.4 km	MPC · JPL
684863	2008 YT_{81}	—	December 31, 2008	Kitt Peak	Spacewatch	AGN	1.0 km	MPC · JPL
684864	2008 YV_{82}	—	December 31, 2008	Kitt Peak	Spacewatch	(5)	1.3 km	MPC · JPL
684865	2008 YQ_{83}	—	December 31, 2008	Kitt Peak	Spacewatch	·	1.9 km	MPC · JPL
684866	2008 YB_{85}	—	December 27, 2008	Bergisch Gladbach	W. Bickel	·	2.6 km	MPC · JPL
684867	2008 YV_{85}	—	December 29, 2008	Kitt Peak	Spacewatch	·	880 m	MPC · JPL
684868	2008 YJ_{87}	—	December 29, 2008	Kitt Peak	Spacewatch	·	1.8 km	MPC · JPL
684869	2008 YR_{103}	—	December 21, 2008	Mount Lemmon	Mount Lemmon Survey	·	1.7 km	MPC · JPL
684870	2008 YW_{104}	—	December 21, 2008	Mount Lemmon	Mount Lemmon Survey	·	840 m	MPC · JPL
684871	2008 YP_{110}	—	May 25, 2006	Kitt Peak	Spacewatch	AGN	990 m	MPC · JPL
684872	2008 YX_{112}	—	December 31, 2008	Kitt Peak	Spacewatch	·	1.2 km	MPC · JPL
684873	2008 YX_{114}	—	December 21, 2008	Kitt Peak	Spacewatch	AST	1.3 km	MPC · JPL
684874	2008 YA_{115}	—	December 21, 2008	Kitt Peak	Spacewatch	HOF	2.3 km	MPC · JPL
684875	2008 YV_{116}	—	December 29, 2008	Kitt Peak	Spacewatch	·	880 m	MPC · JPL
684876	2008 YQ_{120}	—	December 30, 2008	Kitt Peak	Spacewatch	AGN	950 m	MPC · JPL
684877	2008 YN_{129}	—	December 31, 2008	Kitt Peak	Spacewatch	BRA	1.0 km	MPC · JPL
684878	2008 YF_{130}	—	December 31, 2008	Kitt Peak	Spacewatch	·	1.1 km	MPC · JPL
684879	2008 YP_{130}	—	September 15, 2007	Mount Lemmon	Mount Lemmon Survey	·	1.1 km	MPC · JPL
684880	2008 YX_{130}	—	December 31, 2008	Kitt Peak	Spacewatch	MAR	1.1 km	MPC · JPL
684881	2008 YC_{131}	—	December 31, 2008	Mount Lemmon	Mount Lemmon Survey	NEM	1.8 km	MPC · JPL
684882	2008 YH_{132}	—	December 31, 2008	Kitt Peak	Spacewatch	AGN	880 m	MPC · JPL
684883	2008 YA_{133}	—	December 29, 2008	Mount Lemmon	Mount Lemmon Survey	·	700 m	MPC · JPL
684884	2008 YN_{138}	—	December 30, 2008	Kitt Peak	Spacewatch	·	710 m	MPC · JPL
684885	2008 YL_{144}	—	December 30, 2008	Kitt Peak	Spacewatch	·	1.7 km	MPC · JPL
684886	2008 YU_{144}	—	December 30, 2008	Kitt Peak	Spacewatch	·	2.7 km	MPC · JPL
684887	2008 YR_{152}	—	December 30, 2008	Kitt Peak	Spacewatch	·	1.5 km	MPC · JPL
684888	2008 YJ_{158}	—	December 31, 2008	Kitt Peak	Spacewatch	NYS	710 m	MPC · JPL
684889	2008 YS_{162}	—	December 22, 2008	Kitt Peak	Spacewatch	·	1.4 km	MPC · JPL
684890	2008 YE_{164}	—	December 21, 2008	Kitt Peak	Spacewatch	VER	2.4 km	MPC · JPL
684891	2008 YJ_{169}	—	December 29, 2008	Mount Lemmon	Mount Lemmon Survey	·	2.0 km	MPC · JPL
684892	2008 YR_{174}	—	April 20, 2015	Haleakala	Pan-STARRS 1	·	1.5 km	MPC · JPL
684893	2008 YP_{175}	—	December 29, 2008	Mount Lemmon	Mount Lemmon Survey	MAS	510 m	MPC · JPL
684894	2008 YZ_{175}	—	December 30, 2008	Mount Lemmon	Mount Lemmon Survey	·	1.7 km	MPC · JPL
684895	2008 YG_{176}	—	October 25, 2013	Mount Lemmon	Mount Lemmon Survey	HYG	2.9 km	MPC · JPL
684896	2008 YM_{176}	—	November 23, 2012	Kitt Peak	Spacewatch	(5)	1.2 km	MPC · JPL
684897	2008 YQ_{176}	—	October 8, 2012	Kitt Peak	Spacewatch	·	1.3 km	MPC · JPL
684898	2008 YY_{176}	—	February 24, 2014	Haleakala	Pan-STARRS 1	·	1.7 km	MPC · JPL
684899	2008 YU_{177}	—	April 9, 2010	Mount Lemmon	Mount Lemmon Survey	DOR	1.8 km	MPC · JPL
684900	2008 YW_{177}	—	December 31, 2008	Kitt Peak	Spacewatch	AGN	870 m	MPC · JPL

== 684901–685000 ==
back to top

Designation			Discovery			Properties		Ref
Permanent	Provisional	Named after	Date	Site	Discoverer(s)	Category	Diam.	Ref
684901	2008 YV_{179}	—	December 22, 2008	Kitt Peak	Spacewatch	·	660 m	MPC · JPL
684902	2008 YG_{182}	—	December 22, 2008	Kitt Peak	Spacewatch	·	1.7 km	MPC · JPL
684903	2008 YN_{182}	—	November 9, 1996	Kitt Peak	Spacewatch	·	3.1 km	MPC · JPL
684904	2008 YQ_{182}	—	September 16, 2012	Mount Lemmon	Mount Lemmon Survey	EOS	2.0 km	MPC · JPL
684905	2008 YL_{188}	—	December 29, 2008	Kitt Peak	Spacewatch	·	730 m	MPC · JPL
684906	2008 YZ_{191}	—	December 23, 2008	Calar Alto	F. Hormuth	·	1.6 km	MPC · JPL
684907	2008 YL_{192}	—	December 30, 2008	Mount Lemmon	Mount Lemmon Survey	MAS	540 m	MPC · JPL
684908	2008 YC_{194}	—	December 21, 2008	Mount Lemmon	Mount Lemmon Survey	NYS	660 m	MPC · JPL
684909	2008 YP_{194}	—	December 29, 2008	Kitt Peak	Spacewatch	(5)	1.1 km	MPC · JPL
684910	2008 YG_{197}	—	October 9, 2007	Mount Lemmon	Mount Lemmon Survey	·	1.4 km	MPC · JPL
684911	2009 AW_{2}	—	February 14, 2005	Kitt Peak	Spacewatch	WIT	920 m	MPC · JPL
684912	2009 AS_{3}	—	December 30, 2008	Mount Lemmon	Mount Lemmon Survey	(5)	1.1 km	MPC · JPL
684913	2009 AR_{8}	—	September 13, 2007	Mount Lemmon	Mount Lemmon Survey	·	1.6 km	MPC · JPL
684914	2009 AQ_{10}	—	January 2, 2009	Mount Lemmon	Mount Lemmon Survey	·	620 m	MPC · JPL
684915	2009 AU_{10}	—	December 22, 2008	Kitt Peak	Spacewatch	·	3.4 km	MPC · JPL
684916	2009 AV_{10}	—	December 4, 2008	Mount Lemmon	Mount Lemmon Survey	·	1.1 km	MPC · JPL
684917	2009 AX_{13}	—	January 2, 2009	Mount Lemmon	Mount Lemmon Survey	·	940 m	MPC · JPL
684918	2009 AK_{14}	—	September 13, 2007	Kitt Peak	Spacewatch	·	1.5 km	MPC · JPL
684919	2009 AZ_{15}	—	December 31, 2008	Catalina	CSS	·	1.1 km	MPC · JPL
684920	2009 AT_{17}	—	December 21, 2008	Kitt Peak	Spacewatch	·	780 m	MPC · JPL
684921	2009 AJ_{18}	—	December 21, 2008	Mount Lemmon	Mount Lemmon Survey	·	790 m	MPC · JPL
684922	2009 AT_{19}	—	January 2, 2009	Mount Lemmon	Mount Lemmon Survey	(2076)	900 m	MPC · JPL
684923	2009 AV_{23}	—	December 30, 2008	Kitt Peak	Spacewatch	·	1.4 km	MPC · JPL
684924	2009 AP_{29}	—	November 23, 2008	Kitt Peak	Spacewatch	·	2.0 km	MPC · JPL
684925	2009 AG_{30}	—	December 4, 2008	Mount Lemmon	Mount Lemmon Survey	·	1.1 km	MPC · JPL
684926	2009 AV_{34}	—	November 24, 2008	Mount Lemmon	Mount Lemmon Survey	EUN	1.2 km	MPC · JPL
684927	2009 AW_{36}	—	May 16, 2005	Mount Lemmon	Mount Lemmon Survey	VER	3.3 km	MPC · JPL
684928	2009 AX_{37}	—	October 10, 2007	Mount Lemmon	Mount Lemmon Survey	·	1.4 km	MPC · JPL
684929	2009 AY_{37}	—	January 15, 2009	Kitt Peak	Spacewatch	·	620 m	MPC · JPL
684930	2009 AN_{38}	—	January 15, 2009	Kitt Peak	Spacewatch	·	1.5 km	MPC · JPL
684931	2009 AW_{38}	—	January 15, 2009	Kitt Peak	Spacewatch	·	1.5 km	MPC · JPL
684932	2009 AG_{52}	—	January 1, 2009	Kitt Peak	Spacewatch	·	910 m	MPC · JPL
684933	2009 AR_{52}	—	January 15, 2009	Kitt Peak	Spacewatch	·	1.9 km	MPC · JPL
684934	2009 AZ_{52}	—	January 1, 2009	Kitt Peak	Spacewatch	VER	2.5 km	MPC · JPL
684935	2009 AD_{53}	—	January 2, 2009	Kitt Peak	Spacewatch	·	1.2 km	MPC · JPL
684936	2009 AQ_{53}	—	May 1, 2011	Haleakala	Pan-STARRS 1	·	2.7 km	MPC · JPL
684937	2009 AR_{53}	—	January 1, 2009	Kitt Peak	Spacewatch	WAT	1.6 km	MPC · JPL
684938	2009 AW_{53}	—	January 3, 2009	Mount Lemmon	Mount Lemmon Survey	NYS	820 m	MPC · JPL
684939	2009 AB_{54}	—	November 26, 2012	Mount Lemmon	Mount Lemmon Survey	·	1.3 km	MPC · JPL
684940	2009 AD_{55}	—	October 11, 2016	Mount Lemmon	Mount Lemmon Survey	·	1.6 km	MPC · JPL
684941	2009 AU_{56}	—	January 1, 2014	Kitt Peak	Spacewatch	MRX	760 m	MPC · JPL
684942	2009 AW_{56}	—	June 24, 2014	Haleakala	Pan-STARRS 1	·	770 m	MPC · JPL
684943	2009 AB_{57}	—	August 2, 2016	Haleakala	Pan-STARRS 1	·	1.7 km	MPC · JPL
684944	2009 AQ_{59}	—	January 2, 2009	Kitt Peak	Spacewatch	HOF	2.1 km	MPC · JPL
684945	2009 AW_{59}	—	January 2, 2009	Mount Lemmon	Mount Lemmon Survey	AGN	900 m	MPC · JPL
684946	2009 AF_{60}	—	January 3, 2009	Mount Lemmon	Mount Lemmon Survey	·	700 m	MPC · JPL
684947	2009 AP_{60}	—	January 2, 2009	Kitt Peak	Spacewatch	AGN	930 m	MPC · JPL
684948	2009 AY_{62}	—	January 2, 2009	Mount Lemmon	Mount Lemmon Survey	·	1.4 km	MPC · JPL
684949	2009 AK_{63}	—	September 19, 2007	Dauban	Kugel, C. R. F.	·	1.4 km	MPC · JPL
684950	2009 AY_{63}	—	January 3, 2009	Kitt Peak	Spacewatch	·	1.4 km	MPC · JPL
684951	2009 AB_{64}	—	January 1, 2009	Kitt Peak	Spacewatch	GEF	980 m	MPC · JPL
684952	2009 AM_{64}	—	January 3, 2009	Kitt Peak	Spacewatch	·	1.5 km	MPC · JPL
684953	2009 AZ_{65}	—	January 2, 2009	Mount Lemmon	Mount Lemmon Survey	KOR	890 m	MPC · JPL
684954	2009 BE_{7}	—	January 18, 2009	Socorro	LINEAR	PHO	670 m	MPC · JPL
684955	2009 BR_{8}	—	January 15, 2009	Kitt Peak	Spacewatch	·	810 m	MPC · JPL
684956	2009 BD_{12}	—	January 1, 2009	Kitt Peak	Spacewatch	·	1.6 km	MPC · JPL
684957	2009 BA_{18}	—	January 16, 2009	Kitt Peak	Spacewatch	MRX	840 m	MPC · JPL
684958	2009 BP_{23}	—	January 17, 2009	Kitt Peak	Spacewatch	·	2.1 km	MPC · JPL
684959	2009 BG_{27}	—	December 31, 2008	Kitt Peak	Spacewatch	·	1.6 km	MPC · JPL
684960	2009 BV_{28}	—	January 2, 2009	Kitt Peak	Spacewatch	·	1.5 km	MPC · JPL
684961	2009 BV_{30}	—	January 2, 2009	Mount Lemmon	Mount Lemmon Survey	·	1.6 km	MPC · JPL
684962	2009 BX_{43}	—	January 16, 2009	Kitt Peak	Spacewatch	·	860 m	MPC · JPL
684963	2009 BD_{44}	—	January 16, 2009	Kitt Peak	Spacewatch	·	1.9 km	MPC · JPL
684964	2009 BJ_{53}	—	January 16, 2009	Mount Lemmon	Mount Lemmon Survey	·	1.7 km	MPC · JPL
684965	2009 BV_{62}	—	November 30, 2008	Mount Lemmon	Mount Lemmon Survey	·	3.5 km	MPC · JPL
684966	2009 BT_{65}	—	January 20, 2009	Kitt Peak	Spacewatch	·	790 m	MPC · JPL
684967	2009 BQ_{73}	—	January 30, 2009	Wildberg	R. Apitzsch	·	2.0 km	MPC · JPL
684968	2009 BW_{83}	—	January 31, 2009	Kitt Peak	Spacewatch	THM	1.9 km	MPC · JPL
684969	2009 BR_{97}	—	January 25, 2009	Kitt Peak	Spacewatch	·	710 m	MPC · JPL
684970	2009 BY_{97}	—	January 26, 2009	Mount Lemmon	Mount Lemmon Survey	·	1.7 km	MPC · JPL
684971	2009 BK_{105}	—	January 25, 2009	Kitt Peak	Spacewatch	·	720 m	MPC · JPL
684972	2009 BN_{115}	—	January 21, 2002	Kitt Peak	Spacewatch	·	690 m	MPC · JPL
684973	2009 BG_{116}	—	January 18, 2009	Kitt Peak	Spacewatch	NYS	810 m	MPC · JPL
684974	2009 BJ_{118}	—	September 15, 2006	Kitt Peak	Spacewatch	·	1.9 km	MPC · JPL
684975	2009 BM_{118}	—	January 30, 2009	Mount Lemmon	Mount Lemmon Survey	·	1.5 km	MPC · JPL
684976	2009 BX_{119}	—	December 30, 2008	Kitt Peak	Spacewatch	NYS	780 m	MPC · JPL
684977	2009 BL_{121}	—	January 17, 2009	Mount Lemmon	Mount Lemmon Survey	·	3.2 km	MPC · JPL
684978	2009 BX_{121}	—	January 31, 2009	Kitt Peak	Spacewatch	·	2.0 km	MPC · JPL
684979	2009 BZ_{123}	—	January 31, 2009	Kitt Peak	Spacewatch	·	2.2 km	MPC · JPL
684980	2009 BG_{124}	—	October 8, 2007	Mount Lemmon	Mount Lemmon Survey	·	1.3 km	MPC · JPL
684981	2009 BM_{127}	—	January 25, 2009	Kitt Peak	Spacewatch	MAS	560 m	MPC · JPL
684982	2009 BJ_{138}	—	September 13, 2007	Mount Lemmon	Mount Lemmon Survey	·	650 m	MPC · JPL
684983	2009 BN_{142}	—	December 22, 2008	Mount Lemmon	Mount Lemmon Survey	·	870 m	MPC · JPL
684984	2009 BD_{145}	—	January 30, 2009	Kitt Peak	Spacewatch	MAS	570 m	MPC · JPL
684985	2009 BM_{145}	—	January 30, 2009	Kitt Peak	Spacewatch	·	1.4 km	MPC · JPL
684986	2009 BD_{159}	—	January 31, 2009	Kitt Peak	Spacewatch	NYS	740 m	MPC · JPL
684987	2009 BJ_{160}	—	January 31, 2009	Mount Lemmon	Mount Lemmon Survey	·	660 m	MPC · JPL
684988	2009 BM_{164}	—	September 19, 1998	Apache Point	SDSS Collaboration	·	1.9 km	MPC · JPL
684989	2009 BG_{165}	—	January 31, 2009	Kitt Peak	Spacewatch	·	1.3 km	MPC · JPL
684990	2009 BG_{166}	—	October 11, 2007	Kitt Peak	Spacewatch	·	1.3 km	MPC · JPL
684991	2009 BN_{167}	—	November 4, 2007	Kitt Peak	Spacewatch	·	1.6 km	MPC · JPL
684992	2009 BO_{167}	—	January 24, 2009	Cerro Burek	Burek, Cerro	·	1.9 km	MPC · JPL
684993	2009 BF_{193}	—	January 20, 2009	Mount Lemmon	Mount Lemmon Survey	·	1.0 km	MPC · JPL
684994	2009 BU_{193}	—	December 31, 2008	Kitt Peak	Spacewatch	·	1.7 km	MPC · JPL
684995	2009 BM_{194}	—	October 23, 2011	Catalina	CSS	·	800 m	MPC · JPL
684996	2009 BB_{195}	—	September 16, 2012	Catalina	CSS	·	3.3 km	MPC · JPL
684997	2009 BN_{195}	—	January 27, 2009	XuYi	PMO NEO Survey Program	DOR	2.1 km	MPC · JPL
684998	2009 BB_{196}	—	October 26, 2012	Haleakala	Pan-STARRS 1	·	1.6 km	MPC · JPL
684999	2009 BD_{196}	—	June 7, 2011	Mount Lemmon	Mount Lemmon Survey	·	1.8 km	MPC · JPL
685000	2009 BO_{199}	—	January 31, 2009	Kitt Peak	Spacewatch	VER	2.2 km	MPC · JPL

back to top
