= Petr Pravec =

Czech astronomer (born 1967)

Minor planets discovered: 350
see § List of discovered minor planets

Petr Pravec (born September 17, 1967) is a Czech astronomer and a discoverer of minor planets, born in Třinec, Czech Republic.

Pravec is a prolific discoverer of binary asteroids, expert in photometric observations and rotational lightcurves at Ondřejov Observatory. He is credited by the Minor Planet Center with the discovery and co-discovery of 350 numbered minor planets, and is leading the effort of a large consortium of stations called "BinAst" to look for multiplicity in the near-Earth objects and inner main-belt populations.

He is a member of the Academy of Sciences of the Czech Republic.

The main-belt asteroid 4790 Petrpravec, discovered by Eleanor Helin in 1988, is named after him. The official naming citation was published by the Minor Planet Center on 20 June 1997 (M.P.C. 30095).

== List of discovered minor planets ==
7204 Ondřejov	April 3, 1995
7490 Babička	July 31, 1995
7492 Kačenka	October 21, 1995
7849 Janjosefrič^{[A]}	April 18, 1996
8217 Dominikhašek^{[A]}	April 21, 1995
9672 Rosenbergerezek	October 5, 1997
10173 Hanzelkazikmund^{[A]}	April 21, 1995
10221 Kubrick	October 28, 1997
10390 Lenka^{[B]}	August 27, 1997
10395 Jirkahorn^{[B]}	September 23, 1997
10581 Jeníkhollan	July 30, 1995
10633 Akimasa	February 20, 1998
11126 Doleček	October 15, 1996
11167 Kunžak	March 23, 1998
11333 Forman^{[A]}	April 20, 1996
11364 Karlštejn	March 23, 1998
11668 Balios	November 3, 1997
12002 Suess^{[A]}	March 19, 1996
13390 Bouška^{[B]}	March 18, 1999
14517 Monitoma	June 13, 1996
(14559) 1997 WP_{28}	November 29, 1997
14594 Jindrašilhán	September 24, 1998
14976 Josefčapek	September 27, 1997
15053 Bochníček^{[C]}	December 17, 1998
15384 Samková	September 26, 1997
15390 Znojil	October 6, 1997
15395 Rükl	October 21, 1997
15425 Welzl	September 24, 1998
15870 Obůrka	August 16, 1996
15897 Beňačková	August 10, 1997
15898 Kharasterteam^{[A]}	August 26, 1997
15907 Robot	October 6, 1997
(16099) 1999 VQ_{24}^{[D]}	November 29, 1997
16706 Svojsík	July 30, 1995
16801 Petřínpragensis	September 23, 1997
16817 Onderlička	October 30, 1997
16929 Hurník	March 31, 1998
16951 Carolus Quartus	May 19, 1998
17625 Joseflada^{[A]}	January 14, 1996
17702 Kryštofharant	May 1, 1997
17776 Troska	March 22, 1998
17806 Adolfborn	March 31, 1998
18182 Wiener^{[D]}	August 27, 2000
18647 Václavhübner	March 21, 1998
18676 Zdeňkaplavcová	March 30, 1998
19268 Morstadt	October 21, 1995
19291 Karelzeman^{[A]}	October 21, 1995
20254 Úpice	March 21, 1998
20256 Adolfneckař	March 23, 1998
20495 Rimavská Sobota^{[D]}	August 15, 1999

21346 Marieladislav	March 9, 1997
21539 Josefhlávka	August 20, 1998
21656 Knuth^{[D]}	August 9, 1999
21660 Velenia	August 20, 1999
21682 Peštafrantišek	September 9, 1999
22644 Matejbel^{[C]}	July 27, 1998
22824 von Neumann^{[D]}	September 12, 1999
22901 Ivanbella^{[D]}	October 12, 1999
(24323) 2000 AW_{49}^{[D]}	January 5, 2000
24858 Diethelm^{[B]}	January 21, 1996
24999 Hieronymus	July 24, 1998
(25311) 1998 YV_{3}^{[E]}	December 17, 1998
26195 Černohlávek	March 1, 1997
26214 Kalinga	October 30, 1997
(26230) 1998 QR_{1}	August 19, 1998
26376 Roborosa	March 11, 1999
26896 Josefhudec	July 29, 1995
26963 Palorapavý	August 13, 1997
26970 Eliáš	September 23, 1997
26973 Lála^{[B]}	September 29, 1997
27079 Vsetín	October 15, 1998
27088 Valmez	October 22, 1998
27132 Ježek^{[A]}	December 11, 1998
27525 Vartovka^{[D]}	April 29, 2000
(27962) 1997 SY_{1}^{[B]}	September 23, 1997
(27963) 1997 ST_{2}^{[B]}	September 25, 1997
(28150) 1998 UC_{1}	October 17, 1998
(29455) 1997 SX_{1}	September 23, 1997
29464 Leonmiš	October 5, 1997
29473 Krejčí^{[A]}	October 21, 1997
29476 Kvíčala	October 31, 1997
29490 Myslbek	November 19, 1997
29674 Raušal	December 15, 1998
30253 Vítek^{[D]}	April 30, 2000
30564 Olomouc	July 28, 2001
31323 Lysá hora	April 27, 1998
31650 Frýdek-Místek	April 18, 1999
32294 Zajonc^{[D]}	August 26, 2000
33058 Kovařík^{[A]}	October 22, 1997
33157 Pertile	February 24, 1998
33377 Večerníček	February 12, 1999
33528 Jinzeman	April 17, 1999
(33749) 1999 QO	August 19, 1999
34753 Zdeněkmatyáš^{[D]}	August 24, 2001
(35353) 1997 RW_{9}	September 8, 1997
(35355) 1997 SB_{2}	September 23, 1997
35356 Vondrák^{[A]}	September 25, 1997
35364 Donaldpray	October 21, 1997
35365 Cooney	October 21, 1997
36060 Babuška^{[D]}	September 14, 1999

(36471) 2000 QK_{26}^{[D]}	August 27, 2000
36888 Škrabal^{[D]}	September 29, 2000
37141 Povolný	November 2, 2000
37279 Hukvaldy^{[D]}	December 22, 2000
37859 Bobkoff	March 23, 1998
(38271) 1999 RW_{35}^{[B]}	September 12, 1999
38461 Jiřítrnka	October 15, 1999
38684 Velehrad^{[D]}	October 25, 2000
(38685) 2000 QP_{9}^{[D]}	August 26, 2000
(39221) 2000 YK_{8}^{[D]}	December 20, 2000
39890 Bobstephens	March 23, 1998
40106 Erben	August 20, 1998
40440 Dobrovský^{[D]}	September 11, 1999
40441 Jungmann^{[D]}	September 11, 1999
40444 Palacký^{[B]}	September 12, 1999
40459 Rektorys^{[D]}	September 14, 1999
(42838) 1999 PP_{3}^{[D]}	August 13, 1999
42998 Malinafrank^{[D]}	October 17, 1999
(42999) 1999 UQ_{2}	October 18, 1999
44613 Rudolf^{[D]}	September 8, 1999
(44616) 1999 RT_{34}^{[D]}	September 10, 1999
(44728) 1999 TT_{15}^{[D]}	October 13, 1999
46280 Hollar^{[D]}	May 21, 2001
46722 Ireneadler^{[A]}	September 2, 1997
48171 Juza^{[D]}	April 23, 2001
48785 Pitter	September 23, 1997
(48795) 1997 TB_{10}	October 6, 1997
49110 Květafialová^{[A]}	September 16, 1998
(49436) 1998 YX_{2}^{[C]}	December 17, 1998
49448 Macocha	December 21, 1998
51895 Biblialexa^{[D]}	August 19, 2001
52604 Thomayer	October 5, 1997
53159 Mysliveček	February 10, 1999
(55083) 2001 QV_{110}^{[D]}	August 24, 2001
(55603) 2002 RE_{117}^{[D]}	September 7, 2002
55874 Brlka	October 28, 1997
(55933) 1998 FD_{73}^{[B]}	March 30, 1998
58440 Zdeněkstuchlík^{[A]}	April 21, 1996
58595 Joepollock	October 5, 1997
(58596) 1997 TC_{10}	October 6, 1997
(58597) 1997 TH_{10}	October 6, 1997
59470 Paveltoufar	April 17, 1999
59800 Astropis^{[D]}	August 14, 1999
(59835) 1999 RJ_{40}	September 13, 1999
(60007) 1999 TO_{16}^{[D]}	October 13, 1999
(60148) 1999 US_{1}^{[D]}	October 16, 1999
60150 Zacharias^{[D]}	October 19, 1999
(60208) 1999 VQ_{72}	November 15, 1999
(61135) 2000 NT_{2}^{[D]}	July 5, 2000
61404 Očenášek^{[D]}	August 26, 2000

(61645) 2000 QT_{109}^{[D]}	August 27, 2000
62794 Scheirich^{[D]}	October 30, 2000
63162 Davidčapek^{[D]}	December 22, 2000
(63584) 2001 QY_{33}^{[D]}	August 19, 2001
(63655) 2001 QV_{113}^{[D]}	August 26, 2001
66151 Josefhanuš	August 26, 2001
(66486) 1999 RF_{42}^{[D]}	September 14, 1999
(67411) 2000 QJ_{26}^{[D]}	August 26, 2000
(69560) 1997 UW_{14}	October 31, 1997
(69845) 1998 SU_{26}	September 24, 1998
(70216) 1999 RH_{42}^{[D]}	September 14, 1999
(70815) 1999 VR_{72}	November 15, 1999
(71783) 2000 SL_{163}^{[D]}	September 30, 2000
72447 Polińska^{[A]}	February 16, 2001
(72886) 2001 KC_{18}^{[D]}	May 21, 2001
(74232) 1998 ST_{26}	September 24, 1998
74764 Rudolfpešek^{[D]}	September 15, 1999
75009 Petervereš^{[D]}	October 16, 1999
(77593) 2001 KJ_{20}^{[D]}	May 22, 2001
77621 Koten^{[D]}	May 25, 2001
78536 Shrbený^{[D]}	September 7, 2002
(78540) 2002 RH_{117}^{[D]}	September 7, 2002
(78542) 2002 RH_{119}^{[D]}	September 9, 2002
(79646) 1998 SB_{13}	September 22, 1998
(79913) 1999 CE_{3}	February 9, 1999
82464 Jaroslavboček^{[A]}	July 21, 2001
(82928) 2001 QM_{110}^{[D]}	August 19, 2001
(82929) 2001 QN_{110}^{[D]}	August 20, 2001
(82930) 2001 QZ_{110}^{[D]}	August 24, 2001
82937 Lesicki^{[D]}	August 26, 2001
(85484) 1997 QV_{2}^{[F]}	August 30, 1997
(86048) 1999 PP_{1}^{[D]}	August 9, 1999
87088 Joannewheeler^{[D]}	June 2, 2000
89282 Suzieimber^{[D]}	November 10, 2001
(89350) 2001 VM_{71}^{[D]}	November 11, 2001
(90934) 1997 TD_{10}	October 6, 1997
(91427) 1999 PB_{5}^{[D]}	August 14, 1999
(91452) 1999 RL_{43}^{[D]}	September 14, 1999
(91600) 1999 TN_{16}^{[D]}	October 13, 1999
(91844) 1999 UR_{2}^{[D]}	October 19, 1999
92389 Gretskij^{[D]}	May 3, 2000
(93255) 2000 SC_{163}^{[D]}	September 29, 2000
(93256) 2000 SD_{163}^{[D]}	September 29, 2000
(94266) 2001 DO^{[A]}	February 16, 2001
94556 Janstarý^{[D]}	November 11, 2001
(94596) 2001 VW_{71}^{[D]}	November 14, 2001
(96342) 1997 PF_{2}	August 8, 1997
96765 Poznańuni^{[D]}	September 10, 1999
97786 Oauam^{[D]}	July 5, 2000
98127 Vilgusová^{[A]}	September 24, 2000

(99921) 1999 RO_{190}^{[D]}	September 15, 1999
(100277) 1994 XB_{5}	December 2, 1994
100308 ČAS^{[A]}	April 21, 1995
(100606) 1997 SU_{2}	September 25, 1997
(100607) 1997 SB_{4}	September 26, 1997
(100630) 1997 UQ_{7}	October 22, 1997
(101186) 1998 SD_{13}	September 23, 1998
(101197) 1998 SH_{27}	September 25, 1998
(101367) 1998 UB_{1}	October 16, 1998
(101410) 1998 VZ_{6}	November 12, 1998
(102228) 1999 TG_{15}^{[D]}	October 12, 1998
(102229) 1999 TS_{17}^{[D]}	October 15, 1998
(103016) 1999 XH_{105}^{[D]}	December 8, 1999
(107555) 2001 DH_{80}^{[D]}	February 19, 2001
(108378) 2001 KK_{20}^{[D]}	May 22, 2001
(109354) 2001 QU_{153}^{[D]}	August 26, 2001
(113210) 2002 RF_{117}^{[D]}	September 7, 2002
(118828) 2000 SF_{163}^{[D]}	September 29, 2000
(118829) 2000 SJ_{163}^{[D]}	September 30, 2000
(118993) 2000 YL_{12}^{[D]}	December 22, 2000
(119983) 2002 XB_{39}^{[D]}	December 7, 2002
(120693) 1997 GN_{1}	April 8, 1997
(121339) 1999 TO_{15}^{[D]}	October 13, 1999
(122311) 2000 QL_{9}^{[D]}	August 25, 2000
(122337) 2000 QA_{35}^{[D]}	August 27, 2000
(123606) 2000 YF_{11}^{[D]}	December 22, 2000
(124087) 2001 HY_{15}^{[D]}	April 23, 2001
(125371) 2001 VV_{71}^{[D]}	November 14, 2001
(129512) 1995 UZ_{1}	October 21, 1995
(129769) 1999 HN	April 17, 1999
(129847) 1999 RH_{40}^{[D]}	September 13, 1999
(129887) 1999 TT_{17}^{[D]}	October 15, 1999
(130433) 2000 QO_{9}^{[D]}	August 26, 2000
(130873) 2000 VR_{2}^{[D]}	November 1, 2000
131181 Žebrák^{[A]}	February 15, 2000
(131358) 2001 KA_{2}^{[D]}	May 19, 2001
(131548) 2001 VF_{17}^{[D]}	November 11, 2001
(132159) 2002 EP_{2}^{[D]}	March 8, 2002
(132916) 2002 SE_{28}	September 29, 2002
(134528) 1999 RQ_{38}^{[D]}	September 12, 1999
(134697) 1999 XG_{105}^{[D]}	December 8, 1999
(135337) 2001 TE_{14}^{[D]}	October 13, 2001
(135756) 2002 RN^{[D]}	September 2, 2002
(136834) 1997 UD_{1}	October 21, 1997
(136984) 1998 SW_{10}	September 21, 1998
(139233) 2001 HT_{18}^{[D]}	April 25, 2001
(139244) 2001 HM_{30}	April 24, 2001
(139290) 2001 KC_{2}^{[D]}	May 20, 2001
(139586) 2001 QS_{110}^{[D]}	August 24, 2001
(139591) 2001 QS_{113}^{[D]}	August 25, 2001

(140873) 2001 VH_{17}^{[D]}	November 11, 2001
(142110) 2002 RO^{[D]}	September 2, 2002
(142154) 2002 RM_{28}^{[D]}	September 5, 2002
(142449) 2002 TB	October 1, 2002
(143139) 2002 XC_{39}^{[D]}	December 7, 2002
(145910) 1999 UB^{[D]}	October 16, 1999
(148865) 2001 VF_{76}^{[D]}	November 15, 2001
(148884) 2001 WO_{14}^{[D]}	November 20, 2001
(150157) 1997 GX_{25}	April 11, 1997
(150309) 1999 US_{2}^{[D]}	October 19, 1999
(150636) 2001 BR_{50}^{[D]}	January 27, 2001
(150744) 2001 QE_{94}^{[D]}	August 20, 2001
(150745) 2001 QU_{113}^{[D]}	August 26, 2001
(152590) 1995 OC_{1}	July 30, 1995
(152752) 1999 CX_{3}	February 9, 1999
(152875) 2000 AX_{49}^{[D]}	January 5, 2000
(153616) 2001 TD_{17}^{[D]}	October 14, 2001
(154096) 2002 DE^{[D]}	February 16, 2002
(155432) 1997 SS_{2}^{[B]}	September 25, 1997
(157993) 2000 LP_{8}^{[D]}	June 3, 2000
(162074) 1997 VX_{2}	November 5, 1997
(162496) 2000 QH_{26}^{[D]}	August 26, 2000
(162699) 2000 US_{30}^{[D]}	October 29, 2000
(165655) 2001 KB_{2}^{[D]}	May 19, 2001
(166526) 2002 RK^{[D]}	September 2, 2002
(168504) 1999 TL_{15}^{[D]}	October 12, 1999
(171868) 2001 QR_{110}^{[D]}	August 24, 2001
(173575) 2001 BS_{50}^{[D]}	January 27, 2001
(173909) 2001 VC_{17}^{[D]}	November 10, 2001
174281 Lonský	September 30, 2002
(176346) 2001 TC_{17}^{[D]}	October 14, 2001
(178535) 1999 UA^{[D]}	October 16, 1999
(178752) 2000 VO_{2}	November 1, 2000
(178834) 2001 HA_{16}^{[D]}	April 24, 2001
(181909) 1999 TX_{15}^{[D]}	October 12, 1999
(182278) 2001 KG_{18}^{[D]}	May 20, 2001
185757 Kareltrutnovský^{[D]}	October 12, 1999
(185976) 2001 KY_{41}^{[D]}	May 24, 2001
(190314) 1997 VU_{1}^{[A]}	November 1, 1997
(192418) 1997 PC_{3}	August 10, 1997
(193266) 2000 SN_{163}^{[D]}	September 30, 2000
(194429) 2001 VR_{71}^{[D]}	November 10, 2001
(200359) 2000 PB_{7}^{[A]}	August 1, 2000
(200479) 2000 YO_{12}^{[D]}	December 22, 2000
(200556) 2001 KA_{42}^{[D]}	May 25, 2001
(201112) 2002 HG	April 16, 2002
(202964) 1999 TH_{15}^{[D]}	October 12, 1999
(205082) 1999 TM_{15}^{[D]}	October 12, 1999
(205469) 2001 QY_{113}^{[D]}	August 26, 2001
(208035) 1999 RV_{34}^{[D]}	September 11, 1999

(210661) 2000 QG_{26}^{[D]}	August 26, 2000
(213059) 1999 RG_{42}^{[D]}	September 14, 1999
(213246) 2001 BP_{50}^{[D]}	January 26, 2001
(213251) 2001 CS_{41}^{[A]}	February 15, 2001
(216940) 1999 TM_{16}^{[D]}	October 13, 1999
(217833) 2001 KC_{33}^{[D]}	May 23, 2001
(219205) 1999 VO_{40}^{[D]}	November 15, 1999
(225545) 2000 SO_{163}^{[D]}	September 30, 2000
(231883) 2000 VS_{2}^{[D]}	November 2, 2000
(234386) 2001 QR_{113}^{[D]}	August 25, 2001
(234871) 2002 SK_{28}	September 30, 2002
(237434) 1999 PH_{3}^{[D]}	August 10, 1999
(241657) 2000 JC_{7}^{[D]}	May 6, 2000
(247051) 2000 LZ^{[D]}	June 2, 2000
(249929) 2001 TD_{14}^{[D]}	October 12, 2001
(257844) 2000 KQ_{44}^{[D]}	May 31, 2000
(269953) 2000 SH_{163}^{[D]}	September 30, 2000
(270477) 2002 EK_{5}^{[D]}	March 8, 2002
(270829) 2002 SJ_{28}	September 30, 2002
(276243) 2002 RG_{117}^{[D]}	September 7, 2002
(279606) 2011 ER_{24}^{[A]}	July 22, 2001
(282120) 2001 CU_{41}^{[A]}	February 15, 2001
(285687) 2000 SM_{163}^{[D]}	September 30, 2000
(285802) 2000 YJ_{12}^{[D]}	December 22, 2000
(286083) 2001 TB_{17}^{[D]}	October 14, 2001
(297383) 2000 QO_{1}^{[D]}	August 23, 2000
(306752) 2000 YN_{12}^{[D]}	December 22, 2000
(306977) 2001 VB_{82}^{[D]}	November 15, 2001
(313192) 2001 QT_{113}^{[D]}	August 25, 2001
(322694) 1999 XA_{8}	December 4, 1999
(322731) 2000 SK_{163}^{[D]}	September 30, 2000
(322781) 2001 OD_{17}^{[A]}	July 21, 2001
(334084) 2001 QO_{110}^{[D]}	August 20, 2001
(337384) 2001 QY_{110}^{[D]}	August 24, 2001
(344060) 1995 OL	July 23, 1995
(344191) 2001 KB_{18}^{[D]}	May 20, 2001
(344428) 2002 DD^{[D]}	February 16, 2002
(347768) 2002 CS_{116}	February 15, 2002
(356986) 1997 SA_{4}	September 26, 1997
(360461) 2002 RL^{[D]}	September 2, 2002
(373611) 2002 EQ_{2}^{[D]}	March 8, 2002
(373695) 2002 RJ_{117}^{[D]}	September 8, 2002
(382496) 2001 QX_{110}^{[D]}	August 24, 2001
(387670) 2002 SL_{28}	September 30, 2002
(393414) 2001 QT_{110}^{[D]}	August 24, 2001
(401876) 2001 OH_{17}^{[A]}	July 22, 2001
(401877) 2001 ON_{32}^{[A]}	July 22, 2001
(405059) 2001 TO_{17}^{[A]}	October 14, 2001
(422700) 2000 QB_{35}^{[D]}	August 27, 2000
(516169) 2016 PM_{77}^{[A]}	21 October 1995

(524493) 2002 RM^{[D]}	2 September 2002
(558569) 2015 BN_{6}^{[A]}	21 July 2001
(595410) 2002 RD_{117}^{[D]}	7 September 2002
(605795) 2016 UG_{11}	1 October 2002
(612230) 2001 QP_{110}^{[D]}	20 August 2001
(618602) 2002 DA^{[D]}	16 February 2002
(640485) 2001 QW_{110}^{[D]}	24 August 2001
(649714) 2011 SR_{24}	20 October 1998
(651111) 2012 VC_{98}^{[D]}	11 November 2001
(660529) 2002 CD_{116}^{[D]}	15 February 2002
(660712) 2002 RU_{111}^{[D]}	6 September 2002
(694338) 2015 RM_{192}^{[D]}	12 October 1999
(720443) 2001 OF_{17}^{[A]}	21 July 2001
(732290) 2014 DW_{18}^{[D]}	7 September 2002
(738147) 2016 GX_{218}^{[D]}	8 September 2002
(773972) 1999 TL_{16}^{[D]}	12 October 1999
(847512) 1999 RE_{42}^{[D]}	13 September 1999
^{A} with L. Šarounová^{B} with M. Wolf^{C} with U. Babiaková^{D} with P. Kušnirák^{E} with T. Rezek^{F} with D. Tuma
