= Marek Wolf =

Czech astronomer

Minor planets discovered: 19
see § List of discovered minor planets

Marek Wolf (born 30 June 1957) is a Czech astronomer, former head the Astronomický ústav, Univerzita Karlova v Praze (Astronomical Institute, Charles University of Prague).

He is a discoverer of several asteroids between 1995 and 2001, mostly in collaboration with Czech astronomers Lenka Kotková and Petr Pravec. The Minor Planet Center credits his discoveries under M. Wolf: he is sometimes confused with Max Wolf (1863–1932), a German astronomer and a very famous asteroid hunter who is credited as M. F. Wolf.

== List of discovered minor planets ==
8229 Kozelský	28 December 1996	list^{[A]}
10390 Lenka	27 August 1997	list^{[B]}
10395 Jirkahorn	23 September 1997	list^{[B]}
13390 Bouška	18 March 1999	list^{[B]}
24858 Diethelm	21 January 1996	list^{[B]}
26973 Lála	29 September 1997	list^{[B]}
(27962) 1997 SY_{1}	23 September 1997	list^{[B]}
(27963) 1997 ST_{2}	25 September 1997	list^{[B]}
(29455) 1997 SX_{1}	23 September 1997	list^{[B]}
33040 Pavelmayer	28 September 1997	list
(36174) 1999 SW_{2}	23 September 1999	list^{[A]}

(38271) 1999 RW_{35}	12 September 1999	list^{[B]}
40444 Palacký	12 September 1999	list^{[B]}
(55933) 1998 FD_{73}	30 March 1998	list^{[B]}
(155432) 1997 SS_{2}	25 September 1997	list^{[B]}
(157825) 1997 RE_{8}	12 September 1997	list^{[A]}
(193870) 2001 QF_{154}	29 August 2001	list^{[A]}
(310383) 1995 SM	17 September 1995	list
(455217) 2001 QD_{154}	28 August 2001	list^{[A]}
Co-discovery made with:^{A} L. Kotková^{B} P. Pravec

== See also ==
- List of minor planet discoverers
