= 13390 Bouška =

Main-belt asteroid

Discovery
- Discovered by: P. Pravec; M. Wolf
- Discovery site: Ondřejov Obs.
- Discovery date: 18 March 1999

Designations
- Named after: Jiří Bouška (astronomer)
- Alternative designations: 1999 FQ_{3} · 1981 RH; 1987 DN_{2}
- Minor planet category: main-belt · Eunomia

Orbital characteristics
- Epoch 4 September 2017 (JD 2458000.5)
- Uncertainty parameter 0
- Observation arc: 35.75 yr (13,059 days)
- Aphelion: 3.0394 AU
- Perihelion: 2.1243 AU
- Semi-major axis: 2.5819 AU
- Eccentricity: 0.1772
- Orbital period (sidereal): 4.15 yr (1,515 days)
- Mean anomaly: 212.31°
- Mean motion: 0° 14^{m} 15.36^{s} / day
- Inclination: 13.246°
- Longitude of ascending node: 148.55°
- Argument of perihelion: 250.99°

Physical characteristics
- Dimensions: 6.48 km (calculated); 7.04±0.26 km 7.470±0.076; 7.524±0.100 km
- Synodic rotation period: 7.7572±0.0027 h
- Geometric albedo: 0.21 (assumed); 0.2597±0.0445; 0.263±0.021; 0.270±0.048
- Spectral type: S
- Absolute magnitude (H): 12.7 · 12.80 · 12.804±0.002 (R) · 12.9 · 13.25±0.41

13390 Bouška, provisional designation 1999 FQ_{3}, is a stony Eunomia asteroid from the central region of the asteroid belt, approximately 7 kilometers in diameter. It was discovered by Czech astronomers Petr Pravec and Marek Wolf at Ondřejov Observatory in the Czech Republic on 18 March 1999. It was named after astronomer Jiří Bouška.

== Classification and orbit ==
Bouška is a member of the Eunomia family, a large group of S-type asteroids and the most prominent family in the intermediate main-belt. It orbits the Sun in the central main-belt at a distance of 2.1–3.0 AU once every 4 years and 2 months (1,515 days). Its orbit has an eccentricity of 0.18 and an inclination of 13° with respect to the ecliptic. The body's observation arc begins 18 years prior to its official discovery observation, with its identification as 1981 RH at Lowell's Anderson Mesa Station in 1981.

== Physical characteristics ==
A rotational lightcurve of Bouška was obtained from photometric observations made at the U.S. Palomar Transient Factory, California, in January 2012. It gave a rotation period of 7.7572±0.0027 hours with a brightness variation of 0.30 in magnitude (U=2).

=== Diameter and albedo ===
According to the surveys carried out by NASA's space-based Wide-field Infrared Survey Explorer with its subsequent NEOWISE mission, Bouška measures 7.5 and 7.0 kilometers in diameter and its surface has an albedo of 0.26 and 0.27, respectively. The Collaborative Asteroid Lightcurve Link assumes an albedo of 0.21 – derived from 15 Eunomia, the family's largest member and namesake – and calculates a diameter of 6.5 kilometers.

== Naming ==
This minor planet was named in honor of Jiří Bouška (born 1925), Czech astronomer and retired professor at Charles University, whose research concentrated on the material found between the planets of the Solar System.

Bouška has been a teacher of several generations of Czech astronomers, including one of the discoverers. For decades he has also been the editor of the Czech Astronomical Yearbook and the popular astronomy journal Ríše hvězd (The Realm of Stars), after which the minor planet 4090 Říšehvězd is named. The approved naming citation was published by the Minor Planet Center on 20 March 2000 (M.P.C. 39659).
