= Tomáš Rezek =

Czech footballer

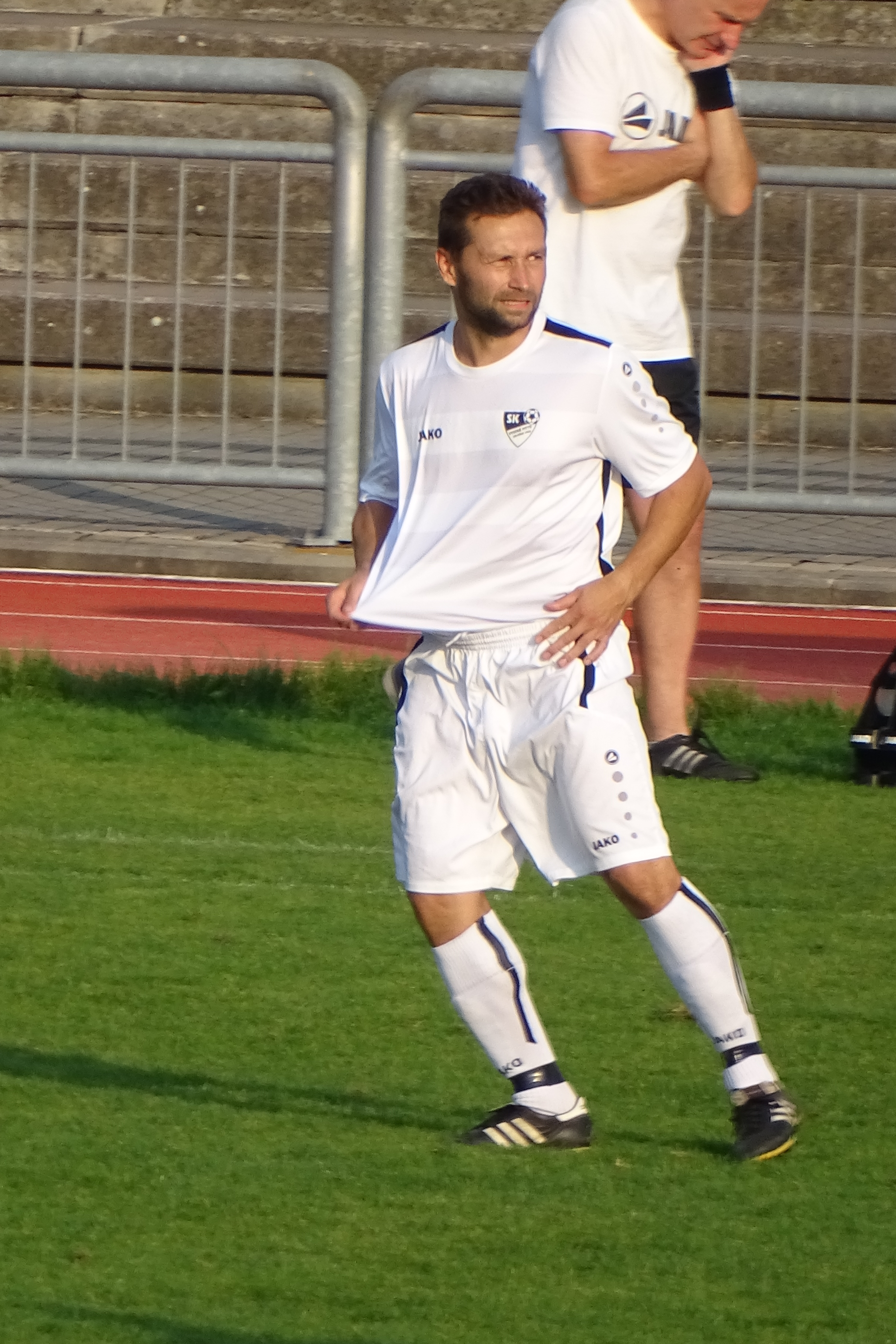

Personal information
- Date of birth: 9 May 1984 (age 42)
- Place of birth: Czechoslovakia
- Height: 1.71 m (5 ft 7 in)
- Position: Midfielder

Team information
- Current team: SK Převýšov

Senior career*
Years	Team	Apps	(Gls)
2008–2013	FC Hradec Králové	104	(4)
2013	→ FK Pardubice (loan)	12	(1)
2013–	SK Převýšov		
- * Club domestic league appearances and goals as of 30 June 2013

Tomáš Rezek (born 9 May 1984) is a professional Czech football player who currently plays for SK Převýšov.
