= List of minor planets: 125001–126000 =

The following is a partial list of minor planets, running from minor-planet number 125001 through 126000, inclusive. The primary data for this and other partial lists is based on JPL's "Small-Body Orbital Elements" and data available from the Minor Planet Center. Critical list information is also provided by the MPC, unless otherwise specified from Lowell Observatory. A detailed description of the table's columns and additional sources are given on the main page including a complete list of every page in this series, and a statistical break-up on the dynamical classification of minor planets.

Also see the summary list of all named bodies in numerical and alphabetical order, and the corresponding naming citations for the number range of this particular list. New namings may only be added to this list after official publication, as the preannouncement of names is condemned by the Working Group for Small Bodies Nomenclature of the International Astronomical Union.

| Near-Earth obj. | MBA (inner) | MBA (outer) | Centaur |
| Mars-crosser | MBA (middle) | Jupiter trojan | Trans-Neptunian obj. |
| Unclassified |

== 125001–125100 ==
| Designation | | | Discovery | | | Properties | | Ref |
| Permanent | Provisional | Named after | Date | Site | Discoverer(s) | Category | Diam. | Ref |
|---|---|---|---|---|---|---|---|---|
| 125001 | 2001 TG_{154} | — | October 15, 2001 | Palomar | NEAT | · | 3.0 km | MPC · JPL |
| 125002 | 2001 TJ_{154} | — | October 15, 2001 | Palomar | NEAT | V | 1.7 km | MPC · JPL |
| 125003 | 2001 TV_{154} | — | October 15, 2001 | Palomar | NEAT | · | 2.6 km | MPC · JPL |
| 125004 | 2001 TQ_{155} | — | October 14, 2001 | Kitt Peak | Spacewatch | · | 1.1 km | MPC · JPL |
| 125005 | 2001 TO_{157} | — | October 14, 2001 | Kitt Peak | Spacewatch | · | 2.0 km | MPC · JPL |
| 125006 | 2001 TK_{159} | — | October 11, 2001 | Palomar | NEAT | · | 2.0 km | MPC · JPL |
| 125007 | 2001 TN_{159} | — | October 11, 2001 | Palomar | NEAT | · | 2.0 km | MPC · JPL |
| 125008 | 2001 TJ_{162} | — | October 11, 2001 | Palomar | NEAT | · | 1.4 km | MPC · JPL |
| 125009 | 2001 TX_{164} | — | October 15, 2001 | Palomar | NEAT | · | 1.3 km | MPC · JPL |
| 125010 | 2001 TD_{166} | — | October 14, 2001 | Socorro | LINEAR | · | 2.5 km | MPC · JPL |
| 125011 | 2001 TE_{168} | — | October 15, 2001 | Socorro | LINEAR | · | 1.5 km | MPC · JPL |
| 125012 | 2001 TQ_{168} | — | October 15, 2001 | Socorro | LINEAR | · | 2.8 km | MPC · JPL |
| 125013 | 2001 TL_{170} | — | October 13, 2001 | Palomar | NEAT | · | 1.5 km | MPC · JPL |
| 125014 | 2001 TA_{173} | — | October 13, 2001 | Socorro | LINEAR | · | 2.3 km | MPC · JPL |
| 125015 | 2001 TF_{174} | — | October 14, 2001 | Socorro | LINEAR | V | 990 m | MPC · JPL |
| 125016 | 2001 TJ_{174} | — | October 14, 2001 | Socorro | LINEAR | fast | 1.9 km | MPC · JPL |
| 125017 | 2001 TM_{174} | — | October 14, 2001 | Socorro | LINEAR | slow | 1.2 km | MPC · JPL |
| 125018 | 2001 TY_{177} | — | October 14, 2001 | Socorro | LINEAR | · | 2.0 km | MPC · JPL |
| 125019 | 2001 TW_{179} | — | October 14, 2001 | Socorro | LINEAR | · | 1.5 km | MPC · JPL |
| 125020 | 2001 TC_{181} | — | October 14, 2001 | Socorro | LINEAR | · | 1.4 km | MPC · JPL |
| 125021 | 2001 TH_{183} | — | October 14, 2001 | Socorro | LINEAR | · | 1.2 km | MPC · JPL |
| 125022 | 2001 TL_{184} | — | October 14, 2001 | Socorro | LINEAR | · | 2.1 km | MPC · JPL |
| 125023 | 2001 TB_{188} | — | October 14, 2001 | Socorro | LINEAR | · | 2.5 km | MPC · JPL |
| 125024 | 2001 TJ_{188} | — | October 14, 2001 | Socorro | LINEAR | NYS · | 3.5 km | MPC · JPL |
| 125025 | 2001 TM_{188} | — | October 14, 2001 | Socorro | LINEAR | · | 2.0 km | MPC · JPL |
| 125026 | 2001 TZ_{188} | — | October 14, 2001 | Socorro | LINEAR | · | 1.6 km | MPC · JPL |
| 125027 | 2001 TL_{189} | — | October 14, 2001 | Socorro | LINEAR | · | 2.2 km | MPC · JPL |
| 125028 | 2001 TM_{189} | — | October 14, 2001 | Socorro | LINEAR | · | 3.1 km | MPC · JPL |
| 125029 | 2001 TF_{191} | — | October 14, 2001 | Socorro | LINEAR | · | 4.1 km | MPC · JPL |
| 125030 | 2001 TT_{191} | — | October 14, 2001 | Socorro | LINEAR | · | 1.5 km | MPC · JPL |
| 125031 | 2001 TV_{191} | — | October 14, 2001 | Socorro | LINEAR | · | 2.4 km | MPC · JPL |
| 125032 | 2001 TE_{192} | — | October 14, 2001 | Socorro | LINEAR | · | 1.5 km | MPC · JPL |
| 125033 | 2001 TP_{192} | — | October 14, 2001 | Socorro | LINEAR | (2076) | 2.8 km | MPC · JPL |
| 125034 | 2001 TE_{193} | — | October 14, 2001 | Socorro | LINEAR | · | 2.3 km | MPC · JPL |
| 125035 | 2001 TH_{194} | — | October 15, 2001 | Socorro | LINEAR | · | 1.6 km | MPC · JPL |
| 125036 | 2001 TL_{194} | — | October 15, 2001 | Socorro | LINEAR | (5) | 2.9 km | MPC · JPL |
| 125037 | 2001 TL_{198} | — | October 11, 2001 | Socorro | LINEAR | · | 2.2 km | MPC · JPL |
| 125038 | 2001 TW_{199} | — | October 11, 2001 | Socorro | LINEAR | V | 1.5 km | MPC · JPL |
| 125039 | 2001 TX_{200} | — | October 11, 2001 | Socorro | LINEAR | · | 2.9 km | MPC · JPL |
| 125040 | 2001 TG_{201} | — | October 11, 2001 | Socorro | LINEAR | · | 3.0 km | MPC · JPL |
| 125041 | 2001 TD_{203} | — | October 11, 2001 | Socorro | LINEAR | · | 2.5 km | MPC · JPL |
| 125042 | 2001 TU_{204} | — | October 11, 2001 | Socorro | LINEAR | PHO | 3.2 km | MPC · JPL |
| 125043 | 2001 TE_{206} | — | October 11, 2001 | Palomar | NEAT | · | 1.2 km | MPC · JPL |
| 125044 | 2001 TO_{208} | — | October 11, 2001 | Palomar | NEAT | NYS | 1.7 km | MPC · JPL |
| 125045 | 2001 TK_{211} | — | October 13, 2001 | Palomar | NEAT | L5 | 23 km | MPC · JPL |
| 125046 | 2001 TO_{212} | — | October 13, 2001 | Palomar | NEAT | V | 1.1 km | MPC · JPL |
| 125047 | 2001 TB_{214} | — | October 13, 2001 | Anderson Mesa | LONEOS | · | 1.1 km | MPC · JPL |
| 125048 | 2001 TW_{215} | — | October 13, 2001 | Palomar | NEAT | L5 | 18 km | MPC · JPL |
| 125049 | 2001 TZ_{217} | — | October 14, 2001 | Anderson Mesa | LONEOS | (5) | 1.6 km | MPC · JPL |
| 125050 | 2001 TN_{218} | — | October 14, 2001 | Anderson Mesa | LONEOS | · | 1.2 km | MPC · JPL |
| 125051 | 2001 TK_{219} | — | October 14, 2001 | Anderson Mesa | LONEOS | · | 2.9 km | MPC · JPL |
| 125052 | 2001 TG_{220} | — | October 14, 2001 | Socorro | LINEAR | (2076) | 2.0 km | MPC · JPL |
| 125053 | 2001 TG_{221} | — | October 14, 2001 | Socorro | LINEAR | · | 2.5 km | MPC · JPL |
| 125054 | 2001 TN_{226} | — | October 14, 2001 | Kitt Peak | Spacewatch | NYS · | 3.1 km | MPC · JPL |
| 125055 | 2001 TF_{227} | — | October 15, 2001 | Socorro | LINEAR | PHO | 3.0 km | MPC · JPL |
| 125056 | 2001 TF_{228} | — | October 15, 2001 | Desert Eagle | W. K. Y. Yeung | · | 3.7 km | MPC · JPL |
| 125057 | 2001 TP_{229} | — | October 15, 2001 | Palomar | NEAT | · | 1.3 km | MPC · JPL |
| 125058 | 2001 TF_{231} | — | October 15, 2001 | Palomar | NEAT | · | 3.3 km | MPC · JPL |
| 125059 | 2001 TB_{233} | — | October 15, 2001 | Palomar | NEAT | L5 | 20 km | MPC · JPL |
| 125060 | 2001 TT_{233} | — | October 15, 2001 | Kitt Peak | Spacewatch | · | 2.4 km | MPC · JPL |
| 125061 | 2001 TU_{233} | — | October 15, 2001 | Kitt Peak | Spacewatch | · | 1.2 km | MPC · JPL |
| 125062 | 2001 TG_{234} | — | October 15, 2001 | Haleakala | NEAT | L5 | 17 km | MPC · JPL |
| 125063 | 2001 TZ_{234} | — | October 15, 2001 | Palomar | NEAT | PHO | 1.5 km | MPC · JPL |
| 125064 | 2001 TK_{236} | — | October 15, 2001 | Palomar | NEAT | · | 3.3 km | MPC · JPL |
| 125065 | 2001 TE_{237} | — | October 8, 2001 | Palomar | NEAT | V | 1.2 km | MPC · JPL |
| 125066 | 2001 TF_{237} | — | October 8, 2001 | Palomar | NEAT | · | 1.6 km | MPC · JPL |
| 125067 | 2001 TC_{238} | — | October 14, 2001 | Anderson Mesa | LONEOS | V | 1.5 km | MPC · JPL |
| 125068 | 2001 TR_{240} | — | October 14, 2001 | Socorro | LINEAR | · | 2.6 km | MPC · JPL |
| 125069 | 2001 TA_{241} | — | October 14, 2001 | Socorro | LINEAR | · | 2.8 km | MPC · JPL |
| 125070 | 2001 TR_{241} | — | October 13, 2001 | Kitt Peak | Spacewatch | · | 3.0 km | MPC · JPL |
| 125071 Lugosi | 2001 TX_{242} | Lugosi | October 8, 2001 | Palomar | K. Sárneczky | · | 1.5 km | MPC · JPL |
| 125072 | 2001 UG | — | October 16, 2001 | Socorro | LINEAR | · | 1.8 km | MPC · JPL |
| 125073 | 2001 UZ | — | October 17, 2001 | Socorro | LINEAR | · | 2.5 km | MPC · JPL |
| 125074 | 2001 UF_{3} | — | October 16, 2001 | Socorro | LINEAR | NYS · | 3.7 km | MPC · JPL |
| 125075 | 2001 UU_{5} | — | October 21, 2001 | Desert Eagle | W. K. Y. Yeung | · | 3.5 km | MPC · JPL |
| 125076 Michelmayor | 2001 UD_{6} | Michelmayor | October 19, 2001 | Vicques | M. Ory | · | 2.2 km | MPC · JPL |
| 125077 | 2001 UE_{7} | — | October 16, 2001 | Socorro | LINEAR | · | 2.1 km | MPC · JPL |
| 125078 | 2001 UK_{7} | — | October 17, 2001 | Socorro | LINEAR | · | 1.3 km | MPC · JPL |
| 125079 | 2001 UY_{8} | — | October 17, 2001 | Socorro | LINEAR | · | 1.2 km | MPC · JPL |
| 125080 | 2001 UA_{9} | — | October 17, 2001 | Socorro | LINEAR | NEM | 3.8 km | MPC · JPL |
| 125081 | 2001 UE_{9} | — | October 17, 2001 | Socorro | LINEAR | · | 2.7 km | MPC · JPL |
| 125082 | 2001 UZ_{10} | — | October 22, 2001 | Desert Eagle | W. K. Y. Yeung | · | 4.2 km | MPC · JPL |
| 125083 | 2001 UM_{12} | — | October 24, 2001 | Desert Eagle | W. K. Y. Yeung | NYS | 1.5 km | MPC · JPL |
| 125084 | 2001 US_{12} | — | October 24, 2001 | Desert Eagle | W. K. Y. Yeung | · | 1.6 km | MPC · JPL |
| 125085 | 2001 UG_{13} | — | October 24, 2001 | Desert Eagle | W. K. Y. Yeung | · | 3.8 km | MPC · JPL |
| 125086 | 2001 UJ_{15} | — | October 24, 2001 | Desert Eagle | W. K. Y. Yeung | · | 3.4 km | MPC · JPL |
| 125087 | 2001 UD_{16} | — | October 25, 2001 | Desert Eagle | W. K. Y. Yeung | · | 2.5 km | MPC · JPL |
| 125088 | 2001 UR_{20} | — | October 17, 2001 | Palomar | NEAT | · | 2.1 km | MPC · JPL |
| 125089 | 2001 UB_{24} | — | October 18, 2001 | Socorro | LINEAR | · | 1.4 km | MPC · JPL |
| 125090 | 2001 UO_{24} | — | October 18, 2001 | Socorro | LINEAR | · | 3.3 km | MPC · JPL |
| 125091 | 2001 UX_{24} | — | October 18, 2001 | Socorro | LINEAR | V | 1.6 km | MPC · JPL |
| 125092 | 2001 UF_{25} | — | October 18, 2001 | Socorro | LINEAR | V | 1.2 km | MPC · JPL |
| 125093 | 2001 UB_{26} | — | October 18, 2001 | Socorro | LINEAR | · | 2.0 km | MPC · JPL |
| 125094 | 2001 UF_{26} | — | October 18, 2001 | Socorro | LINEAR | · | 1.4 km | MPC · JPL |
| 125095 | 2001 UF_{30} | — | October 16, 2001 | Socorro | LINEAR | · | 3.4 km | MPC · JPL |
| 125096 | 2001 UQ_{30} | — | October 16, 2001 | Socorro | LINEAR | · | 2.0 km | MPC · JPL |
| 125097 | 2001 UW_{30} | — | October 16, 2001 | Socorro | LINEAR | · | 1.4 km | MPC · JPL |
| 125098 | 2001 UT_{32} | — | October 16, 2001 | Socorro | LINEAR | · | 1.4 km | MPC · JPL |
| 125099 | 2001 UM_{33} | — | October 16, 2001 | Socorro | LINEAR | · | 1.6 km | MPC · JPL |
| 125100 | 2001 UA_{34} | — | October 16, 2001 | Socorro | LINEAR | · | 2.3 km | MPC · JPL |

== 125101–125200 ==
back to top

| Designation | | | Discovery | | | Properties | | Ref |
| Permanent | Provisional | Named after | Date | Site | Discoverer(s) | Category | Diam. | Ref |
|---|---|---|---|---|---|---|---|---|
| 125101 | 2001 UM_{34} | — | October 16, 2001 | Socorro | LINEAR | · | 1.3 km | MPC · JPL |
| 125102 | 2001 UH_{35} | — | October 16, 2001 | Socorro | LINEAR | · | 2.5 km | MPC · JPL |
| 125103 | 2001 UU_{35} | — | October 16, 2001 | Socorro | LINEAR | · | 2.3 km | MPC · JPL |
| 125104 | 2001 UR_{37} | — | October 17, 2001 | Socorro | LINEAR | V | 1.1 km | MPC · JPL |
| 125105 | 2001 UZ_{37} | — | October 17, 2001 | Socorro | LINEAR | · | 3.1 km | MPC · JPL |
| 125106 | 2001 UR_{39} | — | October 17, 2001 | Socorro | LINEAR | L5 | 10 km | MPC · JPL |
| 125107 | 2001 UH_{40} | — | October 17, 2001 | Socorro | LINEAR | MAS | 1.3 km | MPC · JPL |
| 125108 | 2001 UL_{41} | — | October 17, 2001 | Socorro | LINEAR | MAS | 1.4 km | MPC · JPL |
| 125109 | 2001 UF_{42} | — | October 17, 2001 | Socorro | LINEAR | · | 2.2 km | MPC · JPL |
| 125110 | 2001 UP_{43} | — | October 17, 2001 | Socorro | LINEAR | V | 1.0 km | MPC · JPL |
| 125111 | 2001 UD_{44} | — | October 17, 2001 | Socorro | LINEAR | · | 2.2 km | MPC · JPL |
| 125112 | 2001 UU_{44} | — | October 17, 2001 | Socorro | LINEAR | · | 1.2 km | MPC · JPL |
| 125113 | 2001 UF_{45} | — | October 17, 2001 | Socorro | LINEAR | · | 2.2 km | MPC · JPL |
| 125114 | 2001 UN_{46} | — | October 17, 2001 | Socorro | LINEAR | · | 2.3 km | MPC · JPL |
| 125115 | 2001 UM_{49} | — | October 17, 2001 | Socorro | LINEAR | · | 3.1 km | MPC · JPL |
| 125116 | 2001 UO_{49} | — | October 17, 2001 | Socorro | LINEAR | · | 1.8 km | MPC · JPL |
| 125117 | 2001 UN_{50} | — | October 17, 2001 | Socorro | LINEAR | · | 3.1 km | MPC · JPL |
| 125118 | 2001 UR_{50} | — | October 17, 2001 | Socorro | LINEAR | · | 3.5 km | MPC · JPL |
| 125119 | 2001 UV_{50} | — | October 17, 2001 | Socorro | LINEAR | · | 1.2 km | MPC · JPL |
| 125120 | 2001 UY_{50} | — | October 17, 2001 | Socorro | LINEAR | · | 2.8 km | MPC · JPL |
| 125121 | 2001 UG_{51} | — | October 17, 2001 | Socorro | LINEAR | PHO | 2.2 km | MPC · JPL |
| 125122 | 2001 UJ_{51} | — | October 17, 2001 | Socorro | LINEAR | PHO | 2.3 km | MPC · JPL |
| 125123 | 2001 UW_{51} | — | October 17, 2001 | Socorro | LINEAR | PHO | 1.9 km | MPC · JPL |
| 125124 | 2001 US_{53} | — | October 17, 2001 | Socorro | LINEAR | · | 1.4 km | MPC · JPL |
| 125125 | 2001 UV_{53} | — | October 17, 2001 | Socorro | LINEAR | · | 1.5 km | MPC · JPL |
| 125126 | 2001 UB_{54} | — | October 17, 2001 | Socorro | LINEAR | · | 3.0 km | MPC · JPL |
| 125127 | 2001 UH_{55} | — | October 16, 2001 | Socorro | LINEAR | · | 1.5 km | MPC · JPL |
| 125128 | 2001 UY_{55} | — | October 17, 2001 | Socorro | LINEAR | · | 1.5 km | MPC · JPL |
| 125129 | 2001 UM_{56} | — | October 17, 2001 | Socorro | LINEAR | NYS | 1.6 km | MPC · JPL |
| 125130 | 2001 UO_{56} | — | October 17, 2001 | Socorro | LINEAR | 3:2 | 10 km | MPC · JPL |
| 125131 | 2001 UU_{57} | — | October 17, 2001 | Socorro | LINEAR | · | 1.1 km | MPC · JPL |
| 125132 | 2001 UF_{58} | — | October 17, 2001 | Socorro | LINEAR | V | 1.9 km | MPC · JPL |
| 125133 | 2001 UB_{60} | — | October 17, 2001 | Socorro | LINEAR | (2076) | 2.1 km | MPC · JPL |
| 125134 | 2001 UP_{60} | — | October 17, 2001 | Socorro | LINEAR | V | 1.2 km | MPC · JPL |
| 125135 | 2001 UB_{61} | — | October 17, 2001 | Socorro | LINEAR | NYS | 2.2 km | MPC · JPL |
| 125136 | 2001 UY_{61} | — | October 17, 2001 | Socorro | LINEAR | · | 3.5 km | MPC · JPL |
| 125137 | 2001 UJ_{62} | — | October 17, 2001 | Socorro | LINEAR | NYS | 1.3 km | MPC · JPL |
| 125138 | 2001 UC_{63} | — | October 17, 2001 | Socorro | LINEAR | · | 1.6 km | MPC · JPL |
| 125139 | 2001 UD_{63} | — | October 17, 2001 | Socorro | LINEAR | · | 2.7 km | MPC · JPL |
| 125140 | 2001 UG_{63} | — | October 17, 2001 | Socorro | LINEAR | NYS | 2.1 km | MPC · JPL |
| 125141 | 2001 UW_{63} | — | October 18, 2001 | Socorro | LINEAR | · | 1.4 km | MPC · JPL |
| 125142 | 2001 UF_{64} | — | October 18, 2001 | Socorro | LINEAR | V | 1.4 km | MPC · JPL |
| 125143 | 2001 UG_{66} | — | October 18, 2001 | Socorro | LINEAR | · | 3.2 km | MPC · JPL |
| 125144 | 2001 UT_{66} | — | October 19, 2001 | Socorro | LINEAR | V | 1.6 km | MPC · JPL |
| 125145 | 2001 UE_{76} | — | October 17, 2001 | Socorro | LINEAR | · | 2.5 km | MPC · JPL |
| 125146 | 2001 UU_{79} | — | October 20, 2001 | Socorro | LINEAR | · | 1.9 km | MPC · JPL |
| 125147 | 2001 UK_{81} | — | October 20, 2001 | Socorro | LINEAR | · | 1.3 km | MPC · JPL |
| 125148 | 2001 UR_{81} | — | October 20, 2001 | Socorro | LINEAR | · | 2.4 km | MPC · JPL |
| 125149 | 2001 UU_{81} | — | October 20, 2001 | Socorro | LINEAR | · | 1.2 km | MPC · JPL |
| 125150 | 2001 UZ_{81} | — | October 20, 2001 | Socorro | LINEAR | · | 1.3 km | MPC · JPL |
| 125151 | 2001 UB_{82} | — | October 20, 2001 | Socorro | LINEAR | MAS | 1.0 km | MPC · JPL |
| 125152 | 2001 UO_{83} | — | October 20, 2001 | Socorro | LINEAR | · | 1.2 km | MPC · JPL |
| 125153 | 2001 UZ_{83} | — | October 20, 2001 | Socorro | LINEAR | · | 2.9 km | MPC · JPL |
| 125154 | 2001 UK_{84} | — | October 21, 2001 | Socorro | LINEAR | · | 3.1 km | MPC · JPL |
| 125155 | 2001 UH_{87} | — | October 18, 2001 | Kitt Peak | Spacewatch | · | 1.3 km | MPC · JPL |
| 125156 | 2001 UV_{88} | — | October 16, 2001 | Palomar | NEAT | · | 1.4 km | MPC · JPL |
| 125157 | 2001 UP_{90} | — | October 21, 2001 | Kitt Peak | Spacewatch | MAS | 1.2 km | MPC · JPL |
| 125158 | 2001 UY_{91} | — | October 18, 2001 | Palomar | NEAT | · | 1.5 km | MPC · JPL |
| 125159 | 2001 UV_{93} | — | October 19, 2001 | Haleakala | NEAT | L5 | 22 km | MPC · JPL |
| 125160 | 2001 UZ_{93} | — | October 19, 2001 | Haleakala | NEAT | · | 3.0 km | MPC · JPL |
| 125161 | 2001 UC_{95} | — | October 19, 2001 | Palomar | NEAT | NYS | 1.5 km | MPC · JPL |
| 125162 | 2001 UD_{95} | — | October 19, 2001 | Palomar | NEAT | · | 1.1 km | MPC · JPL |
| 125163 | 2001 UG_{95} | — | October 19, 2001 | Palomar | NEAT | V | 1.1 km | MPC · JPL |
| 125164 | 2001 UW_{95} | — | October 16, 2001 | Socorro | LINEAR | · | 1.6 km | MPC · JPL |
| 125165 | 2001 UU_{96} | — | October 17, 2001 | Socorro | LINEAR | · | 1.1 km | MPC · JPL |
| 125166 | 2001 UL_{98} | — | October 17, 2001 | Socorro | LINEAR | · | 1.9 km | MPC · JPL |
| 125167 | 2001 UP_{102} | — | October 20, 2001 | Socorro | LINEAR | MAS | 1.5 km | MPC · JPL |
| 125168 | 2001 UY_{104} | — | October 20, 2001 | Socorro | LINEAR | · | 2.0 km | MPC · JPL |
| 125169 | 2001 UQ_{105} | — | October 20, 2001 | Socorro | LINEAR | ERI | 4.0 km | MPC · JPL |
| 125170 | 2001 UV_{105} | — | October 20, 2001 | Socorro | LINEAR | · | 1.4 km | MPC · JPL |
| 125171 | 2001 UZ_{106} | — | October 20, 2001 | Socorro | LINEAR | · | 1.6 km | MPC · JPL |
| 125172 | 2001 UW_{107} | — | October 20, 2001 | Socorro | LINEAR | · | 1.2 km | MPC · JPL |
| 125173 | 2001 UA_{108} | — | October 20, 2001 | Socorro | LINEAR | · | 1.3 km | MPC · JPL |
| 125174 | 2001 UF_{109} | — | October 20, 2001 | Socorro | LINEAR | · | 1.7 km | MPC · JPL |
| 125175 | 2001 UL_{109} | — | October 20, 2001 | Socorro | LINEAR | · | 3.6 km | MPC · JPL |
| 125176 | 2001 UP_{109} | — | October 20, 2001 | Socorro | LINEAR | · | 1.8 km | MPC · JPL |
| 125177 | 2001 UE_{110} | — | October 21, 2001 | Socorro | LINEAR | · | 1.6 km | MPC · JPL |
| 125178 | 2001 UG_{113} | — | October 21, 2001 | Socorro | LINEAR | · | 1.2 km | MPC · JPL |
| 125179 | 2001 UM_{114} | — | October 22, 2001 | Socorro | LINEAR | · | 2.5 km | MPC · JPL |
| 125180 | 2001 UY_{115} | — | October 22, 2001 | Socorro | LINEAR | · | 2.7 km | MPC · JPL |
| 125181 | 2001 UW_{116} | — | October 22, 2001 | Socorro | LINEAR | · | 1.7 km | MPC · JPL |
| 125182 | 2001 UX_{116} | — | October 22, 2001 | Socorro | LINEAR | · | 2.2 km | MPC · JPL |
| 125183 | 2001 UA_{117} | — | October 22, 2001 | Socorro | LINEAR | · | 3.3 km | MPC · JPL |
| 125184 | 2001 US_{117} | — | October 22, 2001 | Socorro | LINEAR | · | 2.7 km | MPC · JPL |
| 125185 | 2001 UE_{118} | — | October 22, 2001 | Socorro | LINEAR | · | 1.7 km | MPC · JPL |
| 125186 | 2001 UH_{118} | — | October 22, 2001 | Socorro | LINEAR | MAS | 1.6 km | MPC · JPL |
| 125187 | 2001 UQ_{119} | — | October 22, 2001 | Socorro | LINEAR | · | 1.8 km | MPC · JPL |
| 125188 | 2001 UF_{120} | — | October 22, 2001 | Socorro | LINEAR | · | 1.0 km | MPC · JPL |
| 125189 | 2001 UH_{121} | — | October 22, 2001 | Socorro | LINEAR | · | 1.6 km | MPC · JPL |
| 125190 | 2001 UP_{121} | — | October 22, 2001 | Socorro | LINEAR | · | 1.6 km | MPC · JPL |
| 125191 | 2001 UU_{121} | — | October 22, 2001 | Socorro | LINEAR | · | 1.2 km | MPC · JPL |
| 125192 | 2001 UR_{122} | — | October 22, 2001 | Socorro | LINEAR | · | 1.4 km | MPC · JPL |
| 125193 | 2001 UB_{123} | — | October 22, 2001 | Socorro | LINEAR | MAS | 1.7 km | MPC · JPL |
| 125194 | 2001 UF_{123} | — | October 22, 2001 | Socorro | LINEAR | · | 3.1 km | MPC · JPL |
| 125195 | 2001 UA_{127} | — | October 17, 2001 | Socorro | LINEAR | · | 2.1 km | MPC · JPL |
| 125196 | 2001 UC_{127} | — | October 17, 2001 | Socorro | LINEAR | · | 3.0 km | MPC · JPL |
| 125197 | 2001 UG_{127} | — | October 17, 2001 | Socorro | LINEAR | · | 3.6 km | MPC · JPL |
| 125198 | 2001 UV_{135} | — | October 22, 2001 | Socorro | LINEAR | · | 4.8 km | MPC · JPL |
| 125199 | 2001 UG_{136} | — | October 22, 2001 | Socorro | LINEAR | · | 3.9 km | MPC · JPL |
| 125200 | 2001 UY_{138} | — | October 23, 2001 | Socorro | LINEAR | · | 1.8 km | MPC · JPL |

== 125201–125300 ==
back to top

| Designation | | | Discovery | | | Properties | | Ref |
| Permanent | Provisional | Named after | Date | Site | Discoverer(s) | Category | Diam. | Ref |
|---|---|---|---|---|---|---|---|---|
| 125201 | 2001 UP_{140} | — | October 23, 2001 | Socorro | LINEAR | · | 1.4 km | MPC · JPL |
| 125202 | 2001 US_{140} | — | October 23, 2001 | Socorro | LINEAR | · | 1.0 km | MPC · JPL |
| 125203 | 2001 UY_{140} | — | October 23, 2001 | Socorro | LINEAR | · | 1.5 km | MPC · JPL |
| 125204 | 2001 UE_{144} | — | October 23, 2001 | Socorro | LINEAR | KON | 4.3 km | MPC · JPL |
| 125205 | 2001 UW_{145} | — | October 23, 2001 | Socorro | LINEAR | MAS | 1.2 km | MPC · JPL |
| 125206 | 2001 UQ_{148} | — | October 23, 2001 | Socorro | LINEAR | · | 1.4 km | MPC · JPL |
| 125207 | 2001 UB_{149} | — | October 23, 2001 | Socorro | LINEAR | · | 1.8 km | MPC · JPL |
| 125208 | 2001 UD_{149} | — | October 23, 2001 | Socorro | LINEAR | · | 1.8 km | MPC · JPL |
| 125209 | 2001 UH_{149} | — | October 23, 2001 | Socorro | LINEAR | ERI | 4.1 km | MPC · JPL |
| 125210 | 2001 UQ_{149} | — | October 23, 2001 | Socorro | LINEAR | NYS | 2.2 km | MPC · JPL |
| 125211 | 2001 US_{149} | — | October 23, 2001 | Socorro | LINEAR | · | 2.2 km | MPC · JPL |
| 125212 | 2001 UE_{150} | — | October 23, 2001 | Socorro | LINEAR | · | 2.3 km | MPC · JPL |
| 125213 | 2001 UO_{150} | — | October 23, 2001 | Socorro | LINEAR | · | 3.8 km | MPC · JPL |
| 125214 | 2001 UY_{150} | — | October 23, 2001 | Socorro | LINEAR | · | 2.5 km | MPC · JPL |
| 125215 | 2001 UY_{151} | — | October 23, 2001 | Socorro | LINEAR | · | 3.1 km | MPC · JPL |
| 125216 | 2001 UB_{152} | — | October 23, 2001 | Socorro | LINEAR | · | 2.0 km | MPC · JPL |
| 125217 | 2001 UW_{152} | — | October 23, 2001 | Socorro | LINEAR | · | 1.7 km | MPC · JPL |
| 125218 | 2001 US_{153} | — | October 23, 2001 | Socorro | LINEAR | · | 2.0 km | MPC · JPL |
| 125219 | 2001 UZ_{153} | — | October 23, 2001 | Socorro | LINEAR | V | 1.4 km | MPC · JPL |
| 125220 | 2001 UL_{154} | — | October 23, 2001 | Socorro | LINEAR | · | 2.2 km | MPC · JPL |
| 125221 | 2001 UR_{156} | — | October 23, 2001 | Socorro | LINEAR | · | 1.8 km | MPC · JPL |
| 125222 | 2001 UW_{156} | — | October 23, 2001 | Socorro | LINEAR | · | 1.7 km | MPC · JPL |
| 125223 | 2001 UR_{157} | — | October 23, 2001 | Socorro | LINEAR | · | 1.8 km | MPC · JPL |
| 125224 | 2001 UC_{158} | — | October 23, 2001 | Socorro | LINEAR | · | 1.8 km | MPC · JPL |
| 125225 | 2001 UG_{158} | — | October 23, 2001 | Socorro | LINEAR | · | 2.1 km | MPC · JPL |
| 125226 | 2001 UN_{158} | — | October 23, 2001 | Socorro | LINEAR | MAS | 1.2 km | MPC · JPL |
| 125227 | 2001 UX_{158} | — | October 23, 2001 | Socorro | LINEAR | · | 4.2 km | MPC · JPL |
| 125228 | 2001 UD_{159} | — | October 23, 2001 | Socorro | LINEAR | · | 1.9 km | MPC · JPL |
| 125229 | 2001 UU_{159} | — | October 23, 2001 | Socorro | LINEAR | (2076) | 2.0 km | MPC · JPL |
| 125230 | 2001 UC_{160} | — | October 23, 2001 | Socorro | LINEAR | · | 1.9 km | MPC · JPL |
| 125231 | 2001 UE_{161} | — | October 23, 2001 | Socorro | LINEAR | V | 1.2 km | MPC · JPL |
| 125232 | 2001 UM_{161} | — | October 23, 2001 | Socorro | LINEAR | · | 1.5 km | MPC · JPL |
| 125233 | 2001 UP_{161} | — | October 23, 2001 | Socorro | LINEAR | · | 2.0 km | MPC · JPL |
| 125234 | 2001 UT_{162} | — | October 23, 2001 | Socorro | LINEAR | · | 2.4 km | MPC · JPL |
| 125235 | 2001 UE_{163} | — | October 23, 2001 | Socorro | LINEAR | · | 3.3 km | MPC · JPL |
| 125236 | 2001 UH_{163} | — | October 23, 2001 | Socorro | LINEAR | (2076) | 1.2 km | MPC · JPL |
| 125237 | 2001 UN_{164} | — | October 19, 2001 | Haleakala | NEAT | V | 1.3 km | MPC · JPL |
| 125238 | 2001 UF_{170} | — | October 21, 2001 | Socorro | LINEAR | · | 1.3 km | MPC · JPL |
| 125239 | 2001 UY_{170} | — | October 21, 2001 | Socorro | LINEAR | · | 1.7 km | MPC · JPL |
| 125240 | 2001 UU_{171} | — | October 24, 2001 | Socorro | LINEAR | · | 1.3 km | MPC · JPL |
| 125241 | 2001 UV_{173} | — | October 18, 2001 | Palomar | NEAT | · | 1.8 km | MPC · JPL |
| 125242 | 2001 UC_{174} | — | October 18, 2001 | Palomar | NEAT | · | 2.1 km | MPC · JPL |
| 125243 | 2001 UM_{174} | — | October 18, 2001 | Palomar | NEAT | · | 3.5 km | MPC · JPL |
| 125244 | 2001 UY_{174} | — | October 19, 2001 | Palomar | NEAT | slow | 2.3 km | MPC · JPL |
| 125245 | 2001 UB_{175} | — | October 23, 2001 | Haleakala | NEAT | · | 4.1 km | MPC · JPL |
| 125246 | 2001 UN_{175} | — | October 24, 2001 | Palomar | NEAT | · | 2.8 km | MPC · JPL |
| 125247 | 2001 UC_{176} | — | October 25, 2001 | Kitt Peak | Spacewatch | · | 3.3 km | MPC · JPL |
| 125248 | 2001 UO_{179} | — | October 26, 2001 | Palomar | NEAT | · | 880 m | MPC · JPL |
| 125249 | 2001 UO_{196} | — | October 18, 2001 | Kitt Peak | Spacewatch | · | 1.1 km | MPC · JPL |
| 125250 | 2001 UB_{204} | — | October 19, 2001 | Palomar | NEAT | · | 1.3 km | MPC · JPL |
| 125251 | 2001 UD_{204} | — | October 19, 2001 | Palomar | NEAT | · | 1.1 km | MPC · JPL |
| 125252 | 2001 UH_{205} | — | October 19, 2001 | Palomar | NEAT | · | 1.8 km | MPC · JPL |
| 125253 | 2001 UJ_{205} | — | October 19, 2001 | Palomar | NEAT | · | 1.2 km | MPC · JPL |
| 125254 | 2001 UT_{205} | — | October 19, 2001 | Palomar | NEAT | · | 3.0 km | MPC · JPL |
| 125255 | 2001 UA_{216} | — | October 23, 2001 | Kitt Peak | Spacewatch | · | 2.6 km | MPC · JPL |
| 125256 | 2001 UK_{217} | — | October 24, 2001 | Socorro | LINEAR | · | 1.8 km | MPC · JPL |
| 125257 | 2001 UM_{218} | — | October 26, 2001 | Palomar | NEAT | · | 2.1 km | MPC · JPL |
| 125258 | 2001 UH_{219} | — | October 26, 2001 | Palomar | NEAT | · | 1.4 km | MPC · JPL |
| 125259 | 2001 UQ_{219} | — | October 17, 2001 | Socorro | LINEAR | · | 1.5 km | MPC · JPL |
| 125260 | 2001 UF_{220} | — | October 21, 2001 | Socorro | LINEAR | · | 1.1 km | MPC · JPL |
| 125261 | 2001 UG_{220} | — | October 21, 2001 | Socorro | LINEAR | · | 1.2 km | MPC · JPL |
| 125262 | 2001 UV_{220} | — | October 21, 2001 | Socorro | LINEAR | · | 1.6 km | MPC · JPL |
| 125263 | 2001 UW_{221} | — | October 24, 2001 | Socorro | LINEAR | NYS | 2.1 km | MPC · JPL |
| 125264 | 2001 UX_{221} | — | October 24, 2001 | Socorro | LINEAR | · | 1.3 km | MPC · JPL |
| 125265 | 2001 UT_{222} | — | October 23, 2001 | Kvistaberg | Uppsala-DLR Asteroid Survey | · | 2.6 km | MPC · JPL |
| 125266 | 2001 VG | — | November 7, 2001 | Emerald Lane | L. Ball | · | 1.1 km | MPC · JPL |
| 125267 | 2001 VL_{1} | — | November 9, 2001 | Palomar | NEAT | · | 1.8 km | MPC · JPL |
| 125268 | 2001 VJ_{2} | — | November 10, 2001 | Badlands | Dyvig, R. | · | 1.7 km | MPC · JPL |
| 125269 | 2001 VP_{3} | — | November 11, 2001 | Kitt Peak | Spacewatch | · | 1.3 km | MPC · JPL |
| 125270 | 2001 VT_{3} | — | November 11, 2001 | Kitt Peak | Spacewatch | · | 2.0 km | MPC · JPL |
| 125271 | 2001 VR_{5} | — | November 9, 2001 | Socorro | LINEAR | NYS | 1.5 km | MPC · JPL |
| 125272 | 2001 VC_{6} | — | November 9, 2001 | Socorro | LINEAR | MAS | 960 m | MPC · JPL |
| 125273 | 2001 VA_{8} | — | November 9, 2001 | Socorro | LINEAR | V | 1.3 km | MPC · JPL |
| 125274 | 2001 VE_{10} | — | November 10, 2001 | Socorro | LINEAR | EUN | 2.1 km | MPC · JPL |
| 125275 | 2001 VW_{11} | — | November 10, 2001 | Socorro | LINEAR | · | 8.9 km | MPC · JPL |
| 125276 | 2001 VV_{12} | — | November 10, 2001 | Socorro | LINEAR | PHO | 5.1 km | MPC · JPL |
| 125277 | 2001 VL_{13} | — | November 10, 2001 | Socorro | LINEAR | slow | 1.7 km | MPC · JPL |
| 125278 | 2001 VS_{13} | — | November 10, 2001 | Socorro | LINEAR | · | 1.4 km | MPC · JPL |
| 125279 | 2001 VE_{14} | — | November 10, 2001 | Socorro | LINEAR | · | 2.0 km | MPC · JPL |
| 125280 | 2001 VH_{14} | — | November 10, 2001 | Socorro | LINEAR | · | 2.3 km | MPC · JPL |
| 125281 | 2001 VZ_{14} | — | November 10, 2001 | Socorro | LINEAR | · | 1.7 km | MPC · JPL |
| 125282 | 2001 VM_{15} | — | November 10, 2001 | Socorro | LINEAR | V | 1.3 km | MPC · JPL |
| 125283 | 2001 VN_{18} | — | November 9, 2001 | Socorro | LINEAR | · | 1.7 km | MPC · JPL |
| 125284 | 2001 VH_{19} | — | November 9, 2001 | Socorro | LINEAR | (5) | 1.6 km | MPC · JPL |
| 125285 | 2001 VN_{21} | — | November 9, 2001 | Socorro | LINEAR | · | 1.0 km | MPC · JPL |
| 125286 | 2001 VZ_{22} | — | November 9, 2001 | Socorro | LINEAR | T_{j} (2.98) · 3:2 | 8.4 km | MPC · JPL |
| 125287 | 2001 VG_{23} | — | November 9, 2001 | Socorro | LINEAR | · | 1.8 km | MPC · JPL |
| 125288 | 2001 VQ_{23} | — | November 9, 2001 | Socorro | LINEAR | · | 2.7 km | MPC · JPL |
| 125289 | 2001 VH_{24} | — | November 9, 2001 | Socorro | LINEAR | · | 2.4 km | MPC · JPL |
| 125290 | 2001 VL_{24} | — | November 9, 2001 | Socorro | LINEAR | MAS | 1.4 km | MPC · JPL |
| 125291 | 2001 VR_{24} | — | November 9, 2001 | Socorro | LINEAR | · | 1.3 km | MPC · JPL |
| 125292 | 2001 VU_{24} | — | November 9, 2001 | Socorro | LINEAR | NYS | 2.0 km | MPC · JPL |
| 125293 | 2001 VV_{25} | — | November 9, 2001 | Socorro | LINEAR | · | 2.8 km | MPC · JPL |
| 125294 | 2001 VA_{26} | — | November 9, 2001 | Socorro | LINEAR | · | 2.4 km | MPC · JPL |
| 125295 | 2001 VJ_{26} | — | November 9, 2001 | Socorro | LINEAR | · | 2.6 km | MPC · JPL |
| 125296 | 2001 VS_{27} | — | November 9, 2001 | Socorro | LINEAR | · | 1.7 km | MPC · JPL |
| 125297 | 2001 VW_{27} | — | November 9, 2001 | Socorro | LINEAR | NYS · | 4.0 km | MPC · JPL |
| 125298 | 2001 VC_{28} | — | November 9, 2001 | Socorro | LINEAR | · | 4.0 km | MPC · JPL |
| 125299 | 2001 VK_{28} | — | November 9, 2001 | Socorro | LINEAR | · | 1.9 km | MPC · JPL |
| 125300 | 2001 VT_{28} | — | November 9, 2001 | Socorro | LINEAR | · | 2.9 km | MPC · JPL |

== 125301–125400 ==
back to top

| Designation | | | Discovery | | | Properties | | Ref |
| Permanent | Provisional | Named after | Date | Site | Discoverer(s) | Category | Diam. | Ref |
|---|---|---|---|---|---|---|---|---|
| 125301 | 2001 VW_{28} | — | November 9, 2001 | Socorro | LINEAR | · | 2.0 km | MPC · JPL |
| 125302 | 2001 VY_{28} | — | November 9, 2001 | Socorro | LINEAR | · | 2.0 km | MPC · JPL |
| 125303 | 2001 VS_{29} | — | November 9, 2001 | Socorro | LINEAR | PHO | 1.7 km | MPC · JPL |
| 125304 | 2001 VO_{30} | — | November 9, 2001 | Socorro | LINEAR | V | 2.0 km | MPC · JPL |
| 125305 | 2001 VU_{30} | — | November 9, 2001 | Socorro | LINEAR | · | 3.2 km | MPC · JPL |
| 125306 | 2001 VV_{30} | — | November 9, 2001 | Socorro | LINEAR | · | 2.4 km | MPC · JPL |
| 125307 | 2001 VC_{32} | — | November 9, 2001 | Socorro | LINEAR | · | 2.5 km | MPC · JPL |
| 125308 | 2001 VE_{32} | — | November 9, 2001 | Socorro | LINEAR | · | 3.6 km | MPC · JPL |
| 125309 | 2001 VK_{32} | — | November 9, 2001 | Socorro | LINEAR | NYS · | 4.3 km | MPC · JPL |
| 125310 | 2001 VN_{32} | — | November 9, 2001 | Socorro | LINEAR | · | 2.2 km | MPC · JPL |
| 125311 | 2001 VV_{32} | — | November 9, 2001 | Socorro | LINEAR | · | 2.8 km | MPC · JPL |
| 125312 | 2001 VK_{33} | — | November 9, 2001 | Socorro | LINEAR | · | 2.0 km | MPC · JPL |
| 125313 | 2001 VD_{34} | — | November 9, 2001 | Socorro | LINEAR | V | 1.2 km | MPC · JPL |
| 125314 | 2001 VW_{34} | — | November 9, 2001 | Socorro | LINEAR | NYS | 2.5 km | MPC · JPL |
| 125315 | 2001 VY_{34} | — | November 9, 2001 | Socorro | LINEAR | · | 1.3 km | MPC · JPL |
| 125316 | 2001 VE_{35} | — | November 9, 2001 | Socorro | LINEAR | · | 2.2 km | MPC · JPL |
| 125317 | 2001 VG_{36} | — | November 9, 2001 | Socorro | LINEAR | · | 1.6 km | MPC · JPL |
| 125318 | 2001 VX_{36} | — | November 9, 2001 | Socorro | LINEAR | · | 3.2 km | MPC · JPL |
| 125319 | 2001 VZ_{38} | — | November 9, 2001 | Socorro | LINEAR | · | 2.0 km | MPC · JPL |
| 125320 | 2001 VD_{39} | — | November 9, 2001 | Socorro | LINEAR | · | 2.1 km | MPC · JPL |
| 125321 | 2001 VB_{40} | — | November 9, 2001 | Socorro | LINEAR | · | 1.2 km | MPC · JPL |
| 125322 | 2001 VE_{40} | — | November 9, 2001 | Socorro | LINEAR | MAS | 1.3 km | MPC · JPL |
| 125323 | 2001 VL_{41} | — | November 9, 2001 | Socorro | LINEAR | · | 2.0 km | MPC · JPL |
| 125324 | 2001 VY_{41} | — | November 9, 2001 | Socorro | LINEAR | · | 2.7 km | MPC · JPL |
| 125325 | 2001 VU_{43} | — | November 9, 2001 | Socorro | LINEAR | MAS | 1.6 km | MPC · JPL |
| 125326 | 2001 VJ_{44} | — | November 9, 2001 | Socorro | LINEAR | MAS | 1.5 km | MPC · JPL |
| 125327 | 2001 VQ_{44} | — | November 9, 2001 | Socorro | LINEAR | · | 2.0 km | MPC · JPL |
| 125328 | 2001 VC_{46} | — | November 9, 2001 | Socorro | LINEAR | EUN | 2.6 km | MPC · JPL |
| 125329 | 2001 VO_{46} | — | November 9, 2001 | Socorro | LINEAR | NYS | 2.2 km | MPC · JPL |
| 125330 | 2001 VR_{47} | — | November 9, 2001 | Socorro | LINEAR | · | 2.5 km | MPC · JPL |
| 125331 | 2001 VU_{47} | — | November 9, 2001 | Socorro | LINEAR | NYS | 2.3 km | MPC · JPL |
| 125332 | 2001 VL_{48} | — | November 9, 2001 | Socorro | LINEAR | · | 3.3 km | MPC · JPL |
| 125333 | 2001 VN_{48} | — | November 9, 2001 | Socorro | LINEAR | · | 2.9 km | MPC · JPL |
| 125334 | 2001 VQ_{48} | — | November 9, 2001 | Socorro | LINEAR | · | 2.9 km | MPC · JPL |
| 125335 | 2001 VZ_{48} | — | November 9, 2001 | Socorro | LINEAR | · | 2.4 km | MPC · JPL |
| 125336 | 2001 VA_{49} | — | November 9, 2001 | Socorro | LINEAR | MAR | 3.4 km | MPC · JPL |
| 125337 | 2001 VE_{51} | — | November 10, 2001 | Socorro | LINEAR | · | 2.2 km | MPC · JPL |
| 125338 | 2001 VP_{51} | — | November 10, 2001 | Socorro | LINEAR | · | 1.9 km | MPC · JPL |
| 125339 | 2001 VQ_{51} | — | November 10, 2001 | Socorro | LINEAR | V | 1.1 km | MPC · JPL |
| 125340 | 2001 VE_{52} | — | November 10, 2001 | Socorro | LINEAR | · | 3.5 km | MPC · JPL |
| 125341 | 2001 VV_{52} | — | November 10, 2001 | Socorro | LINEAR | · | 1.2 km | MPC · JPL |
| 125342 | 2001 VA_{53} | — | November 10, 2001 | Socorro | LINEAR | V | 1.3 km | MPC · JPL |
| 125343 | 2001 VA_{54} | — | November 10, 2001 | Socorro | LINEAR | · | 1.4 km | MPC · JPL |
| 125344 | 2001 VB_{54} | — | November 10, 2001 | Socorro | LINEAR | · | 1.4 km | MPC · JPL |
| 125345 | 2001 VP_{54} | — | November 10, 2001 | Socorro | LINEAR | · | 2.8 km | MPC · JPL |
| 125346 | 2001 VU_{54} | — | November 10, 2001 | Socorro | LINEAR | · | 2.5 km | MPC · JPL |
| 125347 | 2001 VN_{55} | — | November 10, 2001 | Socorro | LINEAR | (2076) | 1.4 km | MPC · JPL |
| 125348 | 2001 VB_{57} | — | November 10, 2001 | Socorro | LINEAR | · | 2.2 km | MPC · JPL |
| 125349 | 2001 VA_{59} | — | November 10, 2001 | Socorro | LINEAR | · | 2.3 km | MPC · JPL |
| 125350 | 2001 VD_{59} | — | November 10, 2001 | Socorro | LINEAR | V | 1.5 km | MPC · JPL |
| 125351 | 2001 VA_{60} | — | November 10, 2001 | Socorro | LINEAR | (2076) | 1.1 km | MPC · JPL |
| 125352 | 2001 VB_{60} | — | November 10, 2001 | Socorro | LINEAR | · | 990 m | MPC · JPL |
| 125353 | 2001 VA_{61} | — | November 10, 2001 | Socorro | LINEAR | PHO | 1.9 km | MPC · JPL |
| 125354 | 2001 VT_{61} | — | November 10, 2001 | Socorro | LINEAR | · | 1.4 km | MPC · JPL |
| 125355 | 2001 VR_{62} | — | November 10, 2001 | Socorro | LINEAR | · | 1.6 km | MPC · JPL |
| 125356 | 2001 VW_{62} | — | November 10, 2001 | Socorro | LINEAR | · | 2.4 km | MPC · JPL |
| 125357 | 2001 VK_{64} | — | November 10, 2001 | Socorro | LINEAR | · | 1.7 km | MPC · JPL |
| 125358 | 2001 VU_{64} | — | November 10, 2001 | Socorro | LINEAR | · | 1.9 km | MPC · JPL |
| 125359 | 2001 VF_{65} | — | November 10, 2001 | Socorro | LINEAR | · | 2.4 km | MPC · JPL |
| 125360 | 2001 VL_{65} | — | November 10, 2001 | Socorro | LINEAR | · | 1.7 km | MPC · JPL |
| 125361 | 2001 VB_{66} | — | November 10, 2001 | Socorro | LINEAR | · | 2.7 km | MPC · JPL |
| 125362 | 2001 VL_{66} | — | November 10, 2001 | Socorro | LINEAR | · | 2.2 km | MPC · JPL |
| 125363 | 2001 VF_{67} | — | November 10, 2001 | Socorro | LINEAR | · | 1.9 km | MPC · JPL |
| 125364 | 2001 VT_{68} | — | November 11, 2001 | Socorro | LINEAR | · | 4.5 km | MPC · JPL |
| 125365 | 2001 VD_{69} | — | November 11, 2001 | Socorro | LINEAR | · | 5.3 km | MPC · JPL |
| 125366 | 2001 VS_{70} | — | November 11, 2001 | Socorro | LINEAR | · | 1.2 km | MPC · JPL |
| 125367 | 2001 VZ_{70} | — | November 11, 2001 | Socorro | LINEAR | · | 1.3 km | MPC · JPL |
| 125368 | 2001 VD_{71} | — | November 11, 2001 | Socorro | LINEAR | · | 7.1 km | MPC · JPL |
| 125369 | 2001 VK_{71} | — | November 11, 2001 | Socorro | LINEAR | · | 5.1 km | MPC · JPL |
| 125370 | 2001 VP_{71} | — | November 10, 2001 | Bisei SG Center | BATTeRS | · | 2.8 km | MPC · JPL |
| 125371 Vojáček | 2001 VV_{71} | Vojáček | November 14, 2001 | Ondřejov | P. Kušnirák, P. Pravec | · | 3.4 km | MPC · JPL |
| 125372 | 2001 VE_{72} | — | November 15, 2001 | Modra | Kornoš, L., Tóth | · | 1.6 km | MPC · JPL |
| 125373 | 2001 VN_{74} | — | November 14, 2001 | Kitt Peak | Spacewatch | V | 1.2 km | MPC · JPL |
| 125374 | 2001 VY_{74} | — | November 8, 2001 | Palomar | NEAT | · | 1.7 km | MPC · JPL |
| 125375 | 2001 VG_{77} | — | November 9, 2001 | Palomar | NEAT | · | 4.3 km | MPC · JPL |
| 125376 | 2001 VL_{77} | — | November 12, 2001 | Haleakala | NEAT | PHO | 2.1 km | MPC · JPL |
| 125377 | 2001 VY_{78} | — | November 9, 2001 | Palomar | NEAT | · | 1.8 km | MPC · JPL |
| 125378 | 2001 VF_{79} | — | November 9, 2001 | Palomar | NEAT | · | 2.3 km | MPC · JPL |
| 125379 | 2001 VJ_{79} | — | November 9, 2001 | Palomar | NEAT | · | 2.1 km | MPC · JPL |
| 125380 | 2001 VL_{79} | — | November 9, 2001 | Palomar | NEAT | · | 1.9 km | MPC · JPL |
| 125381 | 2001 VW_{79} | — | November 9, 2001 | Palomar | NEAT | · | 1.0 km | MPC · JPL |
| 125382 | 2001 VD_{80} | — | November 9, 2001 | Palomar | NEAT | · | 5.3 km | MPC · JPL |
| 125383 | 2001 VJ_{80} | — | November 10, 2001 | Palomar | NEAT | · | 3.1 km | MPC · JPL |
| 125384 | 2001 VQ_{80} | — | November 10, 2001 | Palomar | NEAT | · | 2.3 km | MPC · JPL |
| 125385 | 2001 VQ_{82} | — | November 10, 2001 | Socorro | LINEAR | · | 2.1 km | MPC · JPL |
| 125386 | 2001 VG_{83} | — | November 10, 2001 | Socorro | LINEAR | · | 1.9 km | MPC · JPL |
| 125387 | 2001 VN_{83} | — | November 10, 2001 | Socorro | LINEAR | NYS · | 3.6 km | MPC · JPL |
| 125388 | 2001 VF_{84} | — | November 11, 2001 | Socorro | LINEAR | · | 4.0 km | MPC · JPL |
| 125389 | 2001 VG_{84} | — | November 11, 2001 | Socorro | LINEAR | · | 2.8 km | MPC · JPL |
| 125390 | 2001 VZ_{84} | — | November 12, 2001 | Socorro | LINEAR | V | 1.3 km | MPC · JPL |
| 125391 | 2001 VK_{88} | — | November 12, 2001 | Haleakala | NEAT | · | 2.7 km | MPC · JPL |
| 125392 | 2001 VU_{91} | — | November 15, 2001 | Socorro | LINEAR | · | 2.7 km | MPC · JPL |
| 125393 | 2001 VS_{94} | — | November 15, 2001 | Socorro | LINEAR | · | 3.3 km | MPC · JPL |
| 125394 | 2001 VN_{96} | — | November 15, 2001 | Socorro | LINEAR | · | 2.1 km | MPC · JPL |
| 125395 | 2001 VS_{96} | — | November 15, 2001 | Socorro | LINEAR | · | 3.4 km | MPC · JPL |
| 125396 | 2001 VW_{97} | — | November 15, 2001 | Socorro | LINEAR | MAR | 3.9 km | MPC · JPL |
| 125397 | 2001 VD_{98} | — | November 15, 2001 | Socorro | LINEAR | EUN | 3.2 km | MPC · JPL |
| 125398 | 2001 VZ_{98} | — | November 15, 2001 | Socorro | LINEAR | · | 3.3 km | MPC · JPL |
| 125399 | 2001 VB_{102} | — | November 12, 2001 | Socorro | LINEAR | ERI | 3.7 km | MPC · JPL |
| 125400 | 2001 VE_{102} | — | November 12, 2001 | Socorro | LINEAR | V | 1 km | MPC · JPL |

== 125401–125500 ==
back to top

| Designation | | | Discovery | | | Properties | | Ref |
| Permanent | Provisional | Named after | Date | Site | Discoverer(s) | Category | Diam. | Ref |
|---|---|---|---|---|---|---|---|---|
| 125401 | 2001 VK_{102} | — | November 12, 2001 | Socorro | LINEAR | · | 2.5 km | MPC · JPL |
| 125402 | 2001 VU_{102} | — | November 12, 2001 | Socorro | LINEAR | · | 1.4 km | MPC · JPL |
| 125403 | 2001 VH_{103} | — | November 12, 2001 | Socorro | LINEAR | · | 1.4 km | MPC · JPL |
| 125404 | 2001 VN_{103} | — | November 12, 2001 | Socorro | LINEAR | NYS | 1.7 km | MPC · JPL |
| 125405 | 2001 VT_{105} | — | November 12, 2001 | Socorro | LINEAR | NYS | 1.6 km | MPC · JPL |
| 125406 | 2001 VU_{105} | — | November 12, 2001 | Socorro | LINEAR | · | 1.0 km | MPC · JPL |
| 125407 | 2001 VV_{105} | — | November 12, 2001 | Socorro | LINEAR | · | 2.5 km | MPC · JPL |
| 125408 | 2001 VP_{106} | — | November 12, 2001 | Socorro | LINEAR | · | 1.6 km | MPC · JPL |
| 125409 | 2001 VR_{106} | — | November 12, 2001 | Socorro | LINEAR | · | 1.6 km | MPC · JPL |
| 125410 | 2001 VW_{106} | — | November 12, 2001 | Socorro | LINEAR | · | 1.3 km | MPC · JPL |
| 125411 | 2001 VK_{107} | — | November 12, 2001 | Socorro | LINEAR | · | 1.4 km | MPC · JPL |
| 125412 | 2001 VJ_{108} | — | November 12, 2001 | Socorro | LINEAR | · | 2.1 km | MPC · JPL |
| 125413 | 2001 VE_{109} | — | November 12, 2001 | Socorro | LINEAR | · | 1.5 km | MPC · JPL |
| 125414 | 2001 VG_{109} | — | November 12, 2001 | Socorro | LINEAR | · | 1.3 km | MPC · JPL |
| 125415 | 2001 VV_{109} | — | November 12, 2001 | Socorro | LINEAR | · | 2.1 km | MPC · JPL |
| 125416 | 2001 VK_{110} | — | November 12, 2001 | Socorro | LINEAR | · | 2.1 km | MPC · JPL |
| 125417 | 2001 VT_{110} | — | November 12, 2001 | Socorro | LINEAR | · | 1.3 km | MPC · JPL |
| 125418 | 2001 VU_{110} | — | November 12, 2001 | Socorro | LINEAR | · | 1.8 km | MPC · JPL |
| 125419 | 2001 VB_{111} | — | November 12, 2001 | Socorro | LINEAR | NYS | 2.1 km | MPC · JPL |
| 125420 | 2001 VK_{111} | — | November 12, 2001 | Socorro | LINEAR | · | 2.6 km | MPC · JPL |
| 125421 | 2001 VM_{111} | — | November 12, 2001 | Socorro | LINEAR | · | 1.8 km | MPC · JPL |
| 125422 | 2001 VJ_{112} | — | November 12, 2001 | Socorro | LINEAR | · | 1.9 km | MPC · JPL |
| 125423 | 2001 VS_{112} | — | November 12, 2001 | Socorro | LINEAR | · | 2.2 km | MPC · JPL |
| 125424 | 2001 VA_{113} | — | November 12, 2001 | Socorro | LINEAR | · | 3.0 km | MPC · JPL |
| 125425 | 2001 VR_{113} | — | November 12, 2001 | Socorro | LINEAR | · | 3.1 km | MPC · JPL |
| 125426 | 2001 VZ_{113} | — | November 12, 2001 | Socorro | LINEAR | · | 1.3 km | MPC · JPL |
| 125427 | 2001 VF_{114} | — | November 12, 2001 | Socorro | LINEAR | EOS | 4.7 km | MPC · JPL |
| 125428 | 2001 VN_{114} | — | November 12, 2001 | Socorro | LINEAR | · | 1.5 km | MPC · JPL |
| 125429 | 2001 VP_{114} | — | November 12, 2001 | Socorro | LINEAR | · | 2.2 km | MPC · JPL |
| 125430 | 2001 VR_{114} | — | November 12, 2001 | Socorro | LINEAR | · | 1.9 km | MPC · JPL |
| 125431 | 2001 VT_{114} | — | November 12, 2001 | Socorro | LINEAR | V | 1.4 km | MPC · JPL |
| 125432 | 2001 VV_{114} | — | November 12, 2001 | Socorro | LINEAR | · | 1.7 km | MPC · JPL |
| 125433 | 2001 VC_{115} | — | November 12, 2001 | Socorro | LINEAR | · | 3.8 km | MPC · JPL |
| 125434 | 2001 VJ_{115} | — | November 12, 2001 | Socorro | LINEAR | (5) | 1.8 km | MPC · JPL |
| 125435 | 2001 VM_{115} | — | November 12, 2001 | Socorro | LINEAR | · | 2.2 km | MPC · JPL |
| 125436 | 2001 VQ_{115} | — | November 12, 2001 | Socorro | LINEAR | · | 2.6 km | MPC · JPL |
| 125437 | 2001 VR_{115} | — | November 12, 2001 | Socorro | LINEAR | · | 2.1 km | MPC · JPL |
| 125438 | 2001 VD_{116} | — | November 12, 2001 | Socorro | LINEAR | · | 1.8 km | MPC · JPL |
| 125439 | 2001 VV_{116} | — | November 12, 2001 | Socorro | LINEAR | · | 2.9 km | MPC · JPL |
| 125440 | 2001 VP_{117} | — | November 12, 2001 | Socorro | LINEAR | NYS | 2.3 km | MPC · JPL |
| 125441 | 2001 VT_{117} | — | November 12, 2001 | Socorro | LINEAR | · | 1.8 km | MPC · JPL |
| 125442 | 2001 VY_{117} | — | November 12, 2001 | Socorro | LINEAR | · | 2.7 km | MPC · JPL |
| 125443 | 2001 VP_{120} | — | November 12, 2001 | Socorro | LINEAR | · | 2.9 km | MPC · JPL |
| 125444 | 2001 VV_{120} | — | November 12, 2001 | Socorro | LINEAR | · | 2.9 km | MPC · JPL |
| 125445 | 2001 VZ_{120} | — | November 12, 2001 | Socorro | LINEAR | V | 1.4 km | MPC · JPL |
| 125446 | 2001 VN_{121} | — | November 15, 2001 | Palomar | NEAT | V | 1.3 km | MPC · JPL |
| 125447 | 2001 VU_{121} | — | November 15, 2001 | Palomar | NEAT | · | 1.9 km | MPC · JPL |
| 125448 | 2001 VL_{122} | — | November 13, 2001 | Haleakala | NEAT | PHO | 2.6 km | MPC · JPL |
| 125449 | 2001 VB_{123} | — | November 11, 2001 | Anderson Mesa | LONEOS | · | 3.7 km | MPC · JPL |
| 125450 | 2001 VK_{124} | — | November 9, 2001 | Socorro | LINEAR | · | 1.0 km | MPC · JPL |
| 125451 | 2001 VW_{125} | — | November 14, 2001 | Kitt Peak | Spacewatch | · | 920 m | MPC · JPL |
| 125452 | 2001 WK | — | November 16, 2001 | Kitt Peak | Spacewatch | · | 880 m | MPC · JPL |
| 125453 | 2001 WR | — | November 16, 2001 | Kitt Peak | Spacewatch | NYS · | 2.2 km | MPC · JPL |
| 125454 | 2001 WW | — | November 16, 2001 | Kitt Peak | Spacewatch | · | 2.6 km | MPC · JPL |
| 125455 | 2001 WD_{3} | — | November 16, 2001 | Kitt Peak | Spacewatch | · | 1.1 km | MPC · JPL |
| 125456 | 2001 WN_{3} | — | November 16, 2001 | Kitt Peak | Spacewatch | · | 1.6 km | MPC · JPL |
| 125457 | 2001 WD_{4} | — | November 17, 2001 | Bisei SG Center | BATTeRS | · | 1.7 km | MPC · JPL |
| 125458 | 2001 WR_{4} | — | November 17, 2001 | Socorro | LINEAR | · | 2.7 km | MPC · JPL |
| 125459 | 2001 WQ_{5} | — | November 20, 2001 | Ametlla de Mar | J. Nomen | ERI | 4.5 km | MPC · JPL |
| 125460 | 2001 WS_{5} | — | November 22, 2001 | Oizumi | T. Kobayashi | NYS | 1.7 km | MPC · JPL |
| 125461 | 2001 WT_{7} | — | November 17, 2001 | Socorro | LINEAR | · | 1.5 km | MPC · JPL |
| 125462 | 2001 WY_{7} | — | November 17, 2001 | Socorro | LINEAR | · | 1.6 km | MPC · JPL |
| 125463 | 2001 WF_{8} | — | November 17, 2001 | Socorro | LINEAR | · | 1.5 km | MPC · JPL |
| 125464 | 2001 WK_{8} | — | November 17, 2001 | Socorro | LINEAR | · | 1.8 km | MPC · JPL |
| 125465 | 2001 WY_{9} | — | November 17, 2001 | Socorro | LINEAR | · | 2.8 km | MPC · JPL |
| 125466 | 2001 WE_{10} | — | November 17, 2001 | Socorro | LINEAR | (5) | 2.2 km | MPC · JPL |
| 125467 | 2001 WK_{10} | — | November 17, 2001 | Socorro | LINEAR | · | 2.4 km | MPC · JPL |
| 125468 | 2001 WL_{10} | — | November 17, 2001 | Socorro | LINEAR | · | 1.6 km | MPC · JPL |
| 125469 | 2001 WM_{11} | — | November 17, 2001 | Socorro | LINEAR | · | 1.8 km | MPC · JPL |
| 125470 | 2001 WL_{13} | — | November 17, 2001 | Socorro | LINEAR | · | 3.2 km | MPC · JPL |
| 125471 | 2001 WC_{14} | — | November 17, 2001 | Socorro | LINEAR | · | 2.7 km | MPC · JPL |
| 125472 | 2001 WM_{14} | — | November 21, 2001 | Socorro | LINEAR | · | 1.9 km | MPC · JPL |
| 125473 Keisaku | 2001 WP_{14} | Keisaku | November 20, 2001 | Kuma Kogen | A. Nakamura | · | 1.1 km | MPC · JPL |
| 125474 | 2001 WR_{14} | — | November 17, 2001 | Kitt Peak | Spacewatch | · | 2.1 km | MPC · JPL |
| 125475 | 2001 WA_{15} | — | November 18, 2001 | Socorro | LINEAR | · | 1.2 km | MPC · JPL |
| 125476 Frangarcia | 2001 WE_{16} | Frangarcia | November 27, 2001 | Pla D'Arguines | R. Ferrando | V | 1.1 km | MPC · JPL |
| 125477 | 2001 WL_{16} | — | November 17, 2001 | Socorro | LINEAR | · | 880 m | MPC · JPL |
| 125478 | 2001 WS_{16} | — | November 17, 2001 | Socorro | LINEAR | · | 1.5 km | MPC · JPL |
| 125479 | 2001 WD_{17} | — | November 17, 2001 | Socorro | LINEAR | · | 3.2 km | MPC · JPL |
| 125480 | 2001 WY_{17} | — | November 17, 2001 | Socorro | LINEAR | · | 1.7 km | MPC · JPL |
| 125481 | 2001 WL_{19} | — | November 17, 2001 | Socorro | LINEAR | · | 1.3 km | MPC · JPL |
| 125482 | 2001 WY_{19} | — | November 17, 2001 | Socorro | LINEAR | NYS | 1.7 km | MPC · JPL |
| 125483 | 2001 WE_{20} | — | November 17, 2001 | Socorro | LINEAR | NYS | 1.6 km | MPC · JPL |
| 125484 | 2001 WL_{20} | — | November 17, 2001 | Socorro | LINEAR | · | 3.2 km | MPC · JPL |
| 125485 | 2001 WR_{20} | — | November 17, 2001 | Socorro | LINEAR | · | 2.2 km | MPC · JPL |
| 125486 | 2001 WX_{23} | — | November 17, 2001 | Kitt Peak | Spacewatch | · | 1.6 km | MPC · JPL |
| 125487 | 2001 WH_{25} | — | November 17, 2001 | Socorro | LINEAR | · | 3.5 km | MPC · JPL |
| 125488 | 2001 WC_{26} | — | November 17, 2001 | Socorro | LINEAR | MAS | 760 m | MPC · JPL |
| 125489 | 2001 WJ_{27} | — | November 17, 2001 | Socorro | LINEAR | · | 2.4 km | MPC · JPL |
| 125490 | 2001 WC_{28} | — | November 17, 2001 | Socorro | LINEAR | V | 1.5 km | MPC · JPL |
| 125491 | 2001 WJ_{28} | — | November 17, 2001 | Socorro | LINEAR | (5) | 2.2 km | MPC · JPL |
| 125492 | 2001 WK_{28} | — | November 17, 2001 | Socorro | LINEAR | · | 2.3 km | MPC · JPL |
| 125493 | 2001 WQ_{28} | — | November 17, 2001 | Socorro | LINEAR | NYS | 2.0 km | MPC · JPL |
| 125494 | 2001 WY_{28} | — | November 17, 2001 | Socorro | LINEAR | · | 4.0 km | MPC · JPL |
| 125495 | 2001 WC_{29} | — | November 17, 2001 | Socorro | LINEAR | (5) | 2.3 km | MPC · JPL |
| 125496 | 2001 WF_{29} | — | November 17, 2001 | Socorro | LINEAR | · | 2.5 km | MPC · JPL |
| 125497 | 2001 WJ_{29} | — | November 17, 2001 | Socorro | LINEAR | · | 2.2 km | MPC · JPL |
| 125498 | 2001 WU_{30} | — | November 17, 2001 | Socorro | LINEAR | EUN | 1.8 km | MPC · JPL |
| 125499 | 2001 WK_{31} | — | November 17, 2001 | Socorro | LINEAR | · | 2.9 km | MPC · JPL |
| 125500 | 2001 WB_{32} | — | November 17, 2001 | Socorro | LINEAR | (2076) | 2.6 km | MPC · JPL |

== 125501–125600 ==
back to top

| Designation | | | Discovery | | | Properties | | Ref |
| Permanent | Provisional | Named after | Date | Site | Discoverer(s) | Category | Diam. | Ref |
|---|---|---|---|---|---|---|---|---|
| 125501 | 2001 WC_{32} | — | November 17, 2001 | Socorro | LINEAR | · | 1.7 km | MPC · JPL |
| 125502 | 2001 WD_{32} | — | November 17, 2001 | Socorro | LINEAR | · | 2.4 km | MPC · JPL |
| 125503 | 2001 WC_{34} | — | November 17, 2001 | Socorro | LINEAR | V | 1.2 km | MPC · JPL |
| 125504 | 2001 WY_{34} | — | November 17, 2001 | Socorro | LINEAR | NYS · | 3.1 km | MPC · JPL |
| 125505 | 2001 WQ_{35} | — | November 17, 2001 | Socorro | LINEAR | NYS | 1.6 km | MPC · JPL |
| 125506 | 2001 WS_{35} | — | November 17, 2001 | Socorro | LINEAR | · | 2.8 km | MPC · JPL |
| 125507 | 2001 WX_{35} | — | November 17, 2001 | Socorro | LINEAR | NYS | 1.7 km | MPC · JPL |
| 125508 | 2001 WG_{37} | — | November 17, 2001 | Socorro | LINEAR | · | 1.5 km | MPC · JPL |
| 125509 | 2001 WQ_{37} | — | November 17, 2001 | Socorro | LINEAR | · | 2.2 km | MPC · JPL |
| 125510 | 2001 WR_{37} | — | November 17, 2001 | Socorro | LINEAR | · | 1.9 km | MPC · JPL |
| 125511 | 2001 WY_{37} | — | November 17, 2001 | Socorro | LINEAR | · | 1.6 km | MPC · JPL |
| 125512 | 2001 WJ_{38} | — | November 17, 2001 | Socorro | LINEAR | · | 3.6 km | MPC · JPL |
| 125513 | 2001 WN_{39} | — | November 17, 2001 | Socorro | LINEAR | · | 2.5 km | MPC · JPL |
| 125514 | 2001 WY_{39} | — | November 17, 2001 | Socorro | LINEAR | · | 2.6 km | MPC · JPL |
| 125515 | 2001 WV_{40} | — | November 17, 2001 | Socorro | LINEAR | · | 3.2 km | MPC · JPL |
| 125516 | 2001 WJ_{41} | — | November 17, 2001 | Socorro | LINEAR | (194) | 3.8 km | MPC · JPL |
| 125517 | 2001 WG_{43} | — | November 18, 2001 | Socorro | LINEAR | · | 2.7 km | MPC · JPL |
| 125518 | 2001 WW_{44} | — | November 18, 2001 | Socorro | LINEAR | EUN | 1.9 km | MPC · JPL |
| 125519 | 2001 WA_{46} | — | November 19, 2001 | Socorro | LINEAR | · | 1.6 km | MPC · JPL |
| 125520 | 2001 WJ_{46} | — | November 19, 2001 | Socorro | LINEAR | · | 1.7 km | MPC · JPL |
| 125521 | 2001 WY_{47} | — | November 19, 2001 | Anderson Mesa | LONEOS | V | 1.2 km | MPC · JPL |
| 125522 | 2001 WG_{48} | — | November 19, 2001 | Anderson Mesa | LONEOS | V | 1.1 km | MPC · JPL |
| 125523 | 2001 WH_{48} | — | November 19, 2001 | Anderson Mesa | LONEOS | · | 2.4 km | MPC · JPL |
| 125524 | 2001 WK_{49} | — | November 25, 2001 | Kingsnake | J. V. McClusky | EUN | 2.4 km | MPC · JPL |
| 125525 | 2001 WH_{51} | — | November 19, 2001 | Socorro | LINEAR | · | 1.2 km | MPC · JPL |
| 125526 | 2001 WD_{57} | — | November 19, 2001 | Socorro | LINEAR | · | 1.5 km | MPC · JPL |
| 125527 | 2001 WU_{63} | — | November 19, 2001 | Socorro | LINEAR | · | 1.5 km | MPC · JPL |
| 125528 | 2001 WB_{64} | — | November 19, 2001 | Socorro | LINEAR | V | 1.2 km | MPC · JPL |
| 125529 | 2001 WH_{65} | — | November 20, 2001 | Socorro | LINEAR | · | 2.1 km | MPC · JPL |
| 125530 | 2001 WF_{73} | — | November 20, 2001 | Socorro | LINEAR | · | 2.8 km | MPC · JPL |
| 125531 | 2001 WH_{83} | — | November 20, 2001 | Socorro | LINEAR | · | 1.8 km | MPC · JPL |
| 125532 | 2001 WR_{84} | — | November 20, 2001 | Socorro | LINEAR | · | 1.7 km | MPC · JPL |
| 125533 | 2001 WK_{85} | — | November 20, 2001 | Socorro | LINEAR | · | 940 m | MPC · JPL |
| 125534 | 2001 WO_{85} | — | November 20, 2001 | Socorro | LINEAR | NYS · | 3.0 km | MPC · JPL |
| 125535 | 2001 WK_{86} | — | November 20, 2001 | Socorro | LINEAR | · | 2.2 km | MPC · JPL |
| 125536 | 2001 WB_{88} | — | November 19, 2001 | Socorro | LINEAR | · | 4.1 km | MPC · JPL |
| 125537 | 2001 WQ_{88} | — | November 19, 2001 | Socorro | LINEAR | · | 1.7 km | MPC · JPL |
| 125538 | 2001 WK_{89} | — | November 20, 2001 | Socorro | LINEAR | · | 1.8 km | MPC · JPL |
| 125539 | 2001 WN_{90} | — | November 21, 2001 | Socorro | LINEAR | HYG | 7.4 km | MPC · JPL |
| 125540 | 2001 WO_{90} | — | November 21, 2001 | Socorro | LINEAR | · | 3.4 km | MPC · JPL |
| 125541 | 2001 WQ_{90} | — | November 21, 2001 | Socorro | LINEAR | · | 1.5 km | MPC · JPL |
| 125542 | 2001 WU_{91} | — | November 21, 2001 | Socorro | LINEAR | · | 8.1 km | MPC · JPL |
| 125543 | 2001 WW_{92} | — | November 21, 2001 | Socorro | LINEAR | ADE | 4.8 km | MPC · JPL |
| 125544 | 2001 WW_{98} | — | November 19, 2001 | Haleakala | NEAT | · | 1.7 km | MPC · JPL |
| 125545 | 2001 WC_{100} | — | November 24, 2001 | Socorro | LINEAR | V | 1.1 km | MPC · JPL |
| 125546 | 2001 XN | — | December 4, 2001 | Socorro | LINEAR | · | 3.4 km | MPC · JPL |
| 125547 | 2001 XJ_{3} | — | December 8, 2001 | Uccle | H. M. J. Boffin | SUL | 4.0 km | MPC · JPL |
| 125548 | 2001 XA_{4} | — | December 9, 2001 | Socorro | LINEAR | · | 1.7 km | MPC · JPL |
| 125549 | 2001 XC_{4} | — | December 9, 2001 | Socorro | LINEAR | · | 5.4 km | MPC · JPL |
| 125550 | 2001 XY_{5} | — | December 7, 2001 | Socorro | LINEAR | · | 5.1 km | MPC · JPL |
| 125551 | 2001 XA_{6} | — | December 7, 2001 | Socorro | LINEAR | · | 1.9 km | MPC · JPL |
| 125552 | 2001 XY_{6} | — | December 11, 2001 | Socorro | LINEAR | · | 2.0 km | MPC · JPL |
| 125553 | 2001 XO_{7} | — | December 8, 2001 | Socorro | LINEAR | · | 2.2 km | MPC · JPL |
| 125554 | 2001 XU_{9} | — | December 9, 2001 | Socorro | LINEAR | · | 2.3 km | MPC · JPL |
| 125555 | 2001 XW_{9} | — | December 9, 2001 | Socorro | LINEAR | · | 3.7 km | MPC · JPL |
| 125556 | 2001 XJ_{10} | — | December 9, 2001 | Socorro | LINEAR | · | 1.8 km | MPC · JPL |
| 125557 | 2001 XU_{12} | — | December 9, 2001 | Socorro | LINEAR | · | 3.1 km | MPC · JPL |
| 125558 | 2001 XM_{13} | — | December 9, 2001 | Socorro | LINEAR | · | 1.7 km | MPC · JPL |
| 125559 | 2001 XN_{13} | — | December 9, 2001 | Socorro | LINEAR | · | 1.2 km | MPC · JPL |
| 125560 | 2001 XS_{13} | — | December 9, 2001 | Socorro | LINEAR | V | 1.7 km | MPC · JPL |
| 125561 | 2001 XN_{14} | — | December 9, 2001 | Socorro | LINEAR | · | 2.5 km | MPC · JPL |
| 125562 | 2001 XP_{14} | — | December 9, 2001 | Socorro | LINEAR | V | 1.2 km | MPC · JPL |
| 125563 | 2001 XH_{15} | — | December 10, 2001 | Socorro | LINEAR | · | 1.9 km | MPC · JPL |
| 125564 | 2001 XV_{15} | — | December 10, 2001 | Socorro | LINEAR | · | 1.5 km | MPC · JPL |
| 125565 | 2001 XQ_{16} | — | December 11, 2001 | Uccle | T. Pauwels | · | 2.1 km | MPC · JPL |
| 125566 | 2001 XJ_{17} | — | December 9, 2001 | Socorro | LINEAR | · | 2.2 km | MPC · JPL |
| 125567 | 2001 XT_{17} | — | December 9, 2001 | Socorro | LINEAR | · | 2.2 km | MPC · JPL |
| 125568 | 2001 XF_{18} | — | December 9, 2001 | Socorro | LINEAR | · | 2.5 km | MPC · JPL |
| 125569 | 2001 XG_{18} | — | December 9, 2001 | Socorro | LINEAR | · | 1.5 km | MPC · JPL |
| 125570 | 2001 XE_{19} | — | December 9, 2001 | Socorro | LINEAR | ADE · | 4.2 km | MPC · JPL |
| 125571 | 2001 XL_{19} | — | December 9, 2001 | Socorro | LINEAR | · | 1.8 km | MPC · JPL |
| 125572 | 2001 XN_{19} | — | December 9, 2001 | Socorro | LINEAR | · | 2.3 km | MPC · JPL |
| 125573 | 2001 XR_{19} | — | December 9, 2001 | Socorro | LINEAR | · | 2.4 km | MPC · JPL |
| 125574 | 2001 XZ_{19} | — | December 9, 2001 | Socorro | LINEAR | V | 1.4 km | MPC · JPL |
| 125575 | 2001 XU_{20} | — | December 9, 2001 | Socorro | LINEAR | · | 2.5 km | MPC · JPL |
| 125576 | 2001 XQ_{21} | — | December 9, 2001 | Socorro | LINEAR | · | 6.7 km | MPC · JPL |
| 125577 | 2001 XW_{22} | — | December 9, 2001 | Socorro | LINEAR | · | 3.2 km | MPC · JPL |
| 125578 | 2001 XW_{23} | — | December 9, 2001 | Socorro | LINEAR | V | 1.4 km | MPC · JPL |
| 125579 | 2001 XT_{24} | — | December 10, 2001 | Socorro | LINEAR | · | 2.2 km | MPC · JPL |
| 125580 | 2001 XA_{25} | — | December 10, 2001 | Socorro | LINEAR | · | 2.3 km | MPC · JPL |
| 125581 | 2001 XG_{25} | — | December 10, 2001 | Socorro | LINEAR | · | 2.6 km | MPC · JPL |
| 125582 | 2001 XQ_{25} | — | December 10, 2001 | Socorro | LINEAR | · | 2.4 km | MPC · JPL |
| 125583 | 2001 XB_{26} | — | December 10, 2001 | Socorro | LINEAR | · | 2.7 km | MPC · JPL |
| 125584 | 2001 XU_{26} | — | December 10, 2001 | Socorro | LINEAR | · | 5.7 km | MPC · JPL |
| 125585 | 2001 XN_{27} | — | December 10, 2001 | Socorro | LINEAR | · | 3.9 km | MPC · JPL |
| 125586 | 2001 XF_{29} | — | December 11, 2001 | Socorro | LINEAR | · | 3.0 km | MPC · JPL |
| 125587 | 2001 XL_{29} | — | December 11, 2001 | Socorro | LINEAR | · | 2.7 km | MPC · JPL |
| 125588 | 2001 XT_{29} | — | December 11, 2001 | Socorro | LINEAR | (5) | 1.7 km | MPC · JPL |
| 125589 | 2001 XS_{31} | — | December 14, 2001 | Oizumi | T. Kobayashi | · | 3.7 km | MPC · JPL |
| 125590 | 2001 XT_{31} | — | December 14, 2001 | Oizumi | T. Kobayashi | · | 1.9 km | MPC · JPL |
| 125591 | 2001 XA_{33} | — | December 10, 2001 | Kitt Peak | Spacewatch | · | 1.4 km | MPC · JPL |
| 125592 Buthiers | 2001 XO_{33} | Buthiers | December 15, 2001 | Buthiers | J.-C. Merlin | · | 3.0 km | MPC · JPL |
| 125593 | 2001 XU_{34} | — | December 9, 2001 | Socorro | LINEAR | · | 3.3 km | MPC · JPL |
| 125594 | 2001 XB_{40} | — | December 9, 2001 | Socorro | LINEAR | · | 5.4 km | MPC · JPL |
| 125595 | 2001 XG_{41} | — | December 9, 2001 | Socorro | LINEAR | · | 4.4 km | MPC · JPL |
| 125596 | 2001 XL_{44} | — | December 9, 2001 | Socorro | LINEAR | · | 5.4 km | MPC · JPL |
| 125597 | 2001 XW_{44} | — | December 9, 2001 | Socorro | LINEAR | · | 1.3 km | MPC · JPL |
| 125598 | 2001 XF_{45} | — | December 9, 2001 | Socorro | LINEAR | · | 4.0 km | MPC · JPL |
| 125599 | 2001 XM_{45} | — | December 9, 2001 | Socorro | LINEAR | V | 1.2 km | MPC · JPL |
| 125600 | 2001 XB_{46} | — | December 9, 2001 | Socorro | LINEAR | · | 3.0 km | MPC · JPL |

== 125601–125700 ==
back to top

| Designation | | | Discovery | | | Properties | | Ref |
| Permanent | Provisional | Named after | Date | Site | Discoverer(s) | Category | Diam. | Ref |
|---|---|---|---|---|---|---|---|---|
| 125601 | 2001 XB_{47} | — | December 9, 2001 | Socorro | LINEAR | PHO | 2.4 km | MPC · JPL |
| 125602 | 2001 XH_{47} | — | December 9, 2001 | Socorro | LINEAR | · | 5.7 km | MPC · JPL |
| 125603 | 2001 XX_{47} | — | December 9, 2001 | Socorro | LINEAR | · | 2.2 km | MPC · JPL |
| 125604 | 2001 XJ_{48} | — | December 10, 2001 | Socorro | LINEAR | · | 2.8 km | MPC · JPL |
| 125605 | 2001 XK_{49} | — | December 10, 2001 | Socorro | LINEAR | (5) | 1.9 km | MPC · JPL |
| 125606 | 2001 XS_{50} | — | December 10, 2001 | Socorro | LINEAR | · | 1.6 km | MPC · JPL |
| 125607 | 2001 XU_{50} | — | December 10, 2001 | Socorro | LINEAR | · | 1.7 km | MPC · JPL |
| 125608 | 2001 XX_{50} | — | December 10, 2001 | Socorro | LINEAR | ERI | 3.0 km | MPC · JPL |
| 125609 | 2001 XS_{51} | — | December 10, 2001 | Socorro | LINEAR | NYS | 1.7 km | MPC · JPL |
| 125610 | 2001 XW_{51} | — | December 10, 2001 | Socorro | LINEAR | NYS · fast | 1.9 km | MPC · JPL |
| 125611 | 2001 XJ_{52} | — | December 10, 2001 | Socorro | LINEAR | · | 1.5 km | MPC · JPL |
| 125612 | 2001 XX_{52} | — | December 10, 2001 | Socorro | LINEAR | MAS | 1.3 km | MPC · JPL |
| 125613 | 2001 XP_{53} | — | December 10, 2001 | Socorro | LINEAR | · | 2.3 km | MPC · JPL |
| 125614 | 2001 XN_{54} | — | December 10, 2001 | Socorro | LINEAR | · | 2.3 km | MPC · JPL |
| 125615 | 2001 XT_{54} | — | December 10, 2001 | Socorro | LINEAR | · | 1.2 km | MPC · JPL |
| 125616 | 2001 XU_{54} | — | December 10, 2001 | Socorro | LINEAR | · | 3.5 km | MPC · JPL |
| 125617 | 2001 XX_{54} | — | December 11, 2001 | Socorro | LINEAR | · | 2.2 km | MPC · JPL |
| 125618 | 2001 XE_{55} | — | December 10, 2001 | Socorro | LINEAR | NYS | 2.2 km | MPC · JPL |
| 125619 | 2001 XL_{55} | — | December 10, 2001 | Socorro | LINEAR | V | 1.8 km | MPC · JPL |
| 125620 | 2001 XH_{56} | — | December 10, 2001 | Socorro | LINEAR | · | 3.6 km | MPC · JPL |
| 125621 | 2001 XW_{56} | — | December 10, 2001 | Socorro | LINEAR | · | 4.0 km | MPC · JPL |
| 125622 | 2001 XE_{57} | — | December 10, 2001 | Socorro | LINEAR | MAS | 1.0 km | MPC · JPL |
| 125623 | 2001 XZ_{57} | — | December 10, 2001 | Socorro | LINEAR | · | 2.4 km | MPC · JPL |
| 125624 | 2001 XN_{58} | — | December 10, 2001 | Socorro | LINEAR | · | 2.2 km | MPC · JPL |
| 125625 | 2001 XO_{58} | — | December 10, 2001 | Socorro | LINEAR | · | 2.1 km | MPC · JPL |
| 125626 | 2001 XU_{58} | — | December 10, 2001 | Socorro | LINEAR | · | 1.5 km | MPC · JPL |
| 125627 | 2001 XY_{58} | — | December 10, 2001 | Socorro | LINEAR | · | 1.3 km | MPC · JPL |
| 125628 | 2001 XD_{59} | — | December 10, 2001 | Socorro | LINEAR | · | 2.1 km | MPC · JPL |
| 125629 | 2001 XF_{59} | — | December 10, 2001 | Socorro | LINEAR | MAS | 1.4 km | MPC · JPL |
| 125630 | 2001 XH_{59} | — | December 10, 2001 | Socorro | LINEAR | MAS | 1.2 km | MPC · JPL |
| 125631 | 2001 XS_{59} | — | December 10, 2001 | Socorro | LINEAR | · | 2.9 km | MPC · JPL |
| 125632 | 2001 XV_{59} | — | December 10, 2001 | Socorro | LINEAR | · | 2.1 km | MPC · JPL |
| 125633 | 2001 XY_{59} | — | December 10, 2001 | Socorro | LINEAR | · | 1.6 km | MPC · JPL |
| 125634 | 2001 XA_{60} | — | December 10, 2001 | Socorro | LINEAR | · | 2.0 km | MPC · JPL |
| 125635 | 2001 XN_{60} | — | December 10, 2001 | Socorro | LINEAR | · | 3.7 km | MPC · JPL |
| 125636 | 2001 XP_{60} | — | December 10, 2001 | Socorro | LINEAR | EUN · | 4.9 km | MPC · JPL |
| 125637 | 2001 XK_{61} | — | December 10, 2001 | Socorro | LINEAR | · | 2.2 km | MPC · JPL |
| 125638 | 2001 XQ_{61} | — | December 10, 2001 | Socorro | LINEAR | · | 2.6 km | MPC · JPL |
| 125639 | 2001 XZ_{61} | — | December 10, 2001 | Socorro | LINEAR | V | 1.3 km | MPC · JPL |
| 125640 | 2001 XC_{63} | — | December 10, 2001 | Socorro | LINEAR | · | 2.3 km | MPC · JPL |
| 125641 | 2001 XO_{63} | — | December 10, 2001 | Socorro | LINEAR | · | 3.2 km | MPC · JPL |
| 125642 | 2001 XX_{63} | — | December 10, 2001 | Socorro | LINEAR | NYS | 2.6 km | MPC · JPL |
| 125643 | 2001 XV_{64} | — | December 10, 2001 | Socorro | LINEAR | · | 1.8 km | MPC · JPL |
| 125644 | 2001 XN_{65} | — | December 10, 2001 | Socorro | LINEAR | · | 2.2 km | MPC · JPL |
| 125645 | 2001 XT_{65} | — | December 10, 2001 | Socorro | LINEAR | · | 2.0 km | MPC · JPL |
| 125646 | 2001 XC_{66} | — | December 10, 2001 | Socorro | LINEAR | · | 3.0 km | MPC · JPL |
| 125647 | 2001 XR_{66} | — | December 10, 2001 | Socorro | LINEAR | NYS | 1.6 km | MPC · JPL |
| 125648 | 2001 XS_{66} | — | December 10, 2001 | Socorro | LINEAR | · | 2.0 km | MPC · JPL |
| 125649 | 2001 XW_{66} | — | December 10, 2001 | Socorro | LINEAR | · | 2.4 km | MPC · JPL |
| 125650 | 2001 XV_{68} | — | December 11, 2001 | Socorro | LINEAR | · | 1.9 km | MPC · JPL |
| 125651 | 2001 XX_{68} | — | December 11, 2001 | Socorro | LINEAR | · | 2.4 km | MPC · JPL |
| 125652 | 2001 XK_{69} | — | December 11, 2001 | Socorro | LINEAR | · | 1.6 km | MPC · JPL |
| 125653 | 2001 XX_{69} | — | December 11, 2001 | Socorro | LINEAR | · | 2.0 km | MPC · JPL |
| 125654 | 2001 XY_{69} | — | December 11, 2001 | Socorro | LINEAR | V | 1.1 km | MPC · JPL |
| 125655 | 2001 XC_{70} | — | December 11, 2001 | Socorro | LINEAR | · | 2.6 km | MPC · JPL |
| 125656 | 2001 XN_{70} | — | December 11, 2001 | Socorro | LINEAR | · | 2.3 km | MPC · JPL |
| 125657 | 2001 XP_{70} | — | December 11, 2001 | Socorro | LINEAR | V | 1.1 km | MPC · JPL |
| 125658 | 2001 XB_{71} | — | December 11, 2001 | Socorro | LINEAR | · | 1.5 km | MPC · JPL |
| 125659 | 2001 XG_{71} | — | December 11, 2001 | Socorro | LINEAR | · | 2.9 km | MPC · JPL |
| 125660 | 2001 XL_{71} | — | December 11, 2001 | Socorro | LINEAR | · | 3.8 km | MPC · JPL |
| 125661 | 2001 XN_{72} | — | December 11, 2001 | Socorro | LINEAR | · | 1.6 km | MPC · JPL |
| 125662 | 2001 XN_{73} | — | December 11, 2001 | Socorro | LINEAR | · | 2.4 km | MPC · JPL |
| 125663 | 2001 XR_{73} | — | December 11, 2001 | Socorro | LINEAR | · | 2.3 km | MPC · JPL |
| 125664 | 2001 XG_{75} | — | December 11, 2001 | Socorro | LINEAR | · | 2.5 km | MPC · JPL |
| 125665 | 2001 XG_{76} | — | December 11, 2001 | Socorro | LINEAR | (21344) | 2.6 km | MPC · JPL |
| 125666 | 2001 XN_{76} | — | December 11, 2001 | Socorro | LINEAR | · | 2.5 km | MPC · JPL |
| 125667 | 2001 XG_{77} | — | December 11, 2001 | Socorro | LINEAR | · | 2.4 km | MPC · JPL |
| 125668 | 2001 XL_{77} | — | December 11, 2001 | Socorro | LINEAR | · | 1.8 km | MPC · JPL |
| 125669 | 2001 XQ_{77} | — | December 11, 2001 | Socorro | LINEAR | · | 1.1 km | MPC · JPL |
| 125670 | 2001 XX_{77} | — | December 11, 2001 | Socorro | LINEAR | · | 3.3 km | MPC · JPL |
| 125671 | 2001 XP_{78} | — | December 11, 2001 | Socorro | LINEAR | · | 1.3 km | MPC · JPL |
| 125672 | 2001 XU_{78} | — | December 11, 2001 | Socorro | LINEAR | · | 3.2 km | MPC · JPL |
| 125673 | 2001 XY_{79} | — | December 11, 2001 | Socorro | LINEAR | · | 2.8 km | MPC · JPL |
| 125674 | 2001 XV_{80} | — | December 11, 2001 | Socorro | LINEAR | V | 1.4 km | MPC · JPL |
| 125675 | 2001 XB_{81} | — | December 11, 2001 | Socorro | LINEAR | · | 1.6 km | MPC · JPL |
| 125676 | 2001 XE_{81} | — | December 11, 2001 | Socorro | LINEAR | · | 2.3 km | MPC · JPL |
| 125677 | 2001 XU_{81} | — | December 11, 2001 | Socorro | LINEAR | · | 1.7 km | MPC · JPL |
| 125678 | 2001 XZ_{81} | — | December 11, 2001 | Socorro | LINEAR | · | 2.8 km | MPC · JPL |
| 125679 | 2001 XR_{82} | — | December 11, 2001 | Socorro | LINEAR | NYS | 1.8 km | MPC · JPL |
| 125680 | 2001 XA_{83} | — | December 11, 2001 | Socorro | LINEAR | · | 2.9 km | MPC · JPL |
| 125681 | 2001 XM_{83} | — | December 11, 2001 | Socorro | LINEAR | · | 2.5 km | MPC · JPL |
| 125682 | 2001 XV_{83} | — | December 11, 2001 | Socorro | LINEAR | (2076) | 1.2 km | MPC · JPL |
| 125683 | 2001 XF_{84} | — | December 11, 2001 | Socorro | LINEAR | · | 1.9 km | MPC · JPL |
| 125684 | 2001 XZ_{84} | — | December 11, 2001 | Socorro | LINEAR | V | 1.3 km | MPC · JPL |
| 125685 | 2001 XX_{85} | — | December 11, 2001 | Socorro | LINEAR | · | 1.5 km | MPC · JPL |
| 125686 | 2001 XB_{87} | — | December 11, 2001 | Socorro | LINEAR | · | 3.1 km | MPC · JPL |
| 125687 | 2001 XQ_{87} | — | December 13, 2001 | Socorro | LINEAR | · | 4.0 km | MPC · JPL |
| 125688 | 2001 XT_{88} | — | December 13, 2001 | Uccle | H. M. J. Boffin | · | 1.9 km | MPC · JPL |
| 125689 | 2001 XX_{88} | — | December 10, 2001 | Socorro | LINEAR | · | 2.5 km | MPC · JPL |
| 125690 | 2001 XE_{89} | — | December 10, 2001 | Socorro | LINEAR | · | 1.3 km | MPC · JPL |
| 125691 | 2001 XK_{89} | — | December 10, 2001 | Socorro | LINEAR | · | 1.6 km | MPC · JPL |
| 125692 | 2001 XM_{89} | — | December 10, 2001 | Socorro | LINEAR | · | 2.6 km | MPC · JPL |
| 125693 | 2001 XT_{89} | — | December 10, 2001 | Socorro | LINEAR | · | 1.3 km | MPC · JPL |
| 125694 | 2001 XD_{90} | — | December 10, 2001 | Socorro | LINEAR | NYS · | 3.5 km | MPC · JPL |
| 125695 | 2001 XF_{92} | — | December 10, 2001 | Socorro | LINEAR | · | 960 m | MPC · JPL |
| 125696 | 2001 XG_{92} | — | December 10, 2001 | Socorro | LINEAR | · | 2.2 km | MPC · JPL |
| 125697 | 2001 XJ_{92} | — | December 10, 2001 | Socorro | LINEAR | · | 1.5 km | MPC · JPL |
| 125698 | 2001 XT_{93} | — | December 10, 2001 | Socorro | LINEAR | · | 1.1 km | MPC · JPL |
| 125699 | 2001 XU_{93} | — | December 10, 2001 | Socorro | LINEAR | · | 2.3 km | MPC · JPL |
| 125700 | 2001 XN_{94} | — | December 10, 2001 | Socorro | LINEAR | ERI | 3.4 km | MPC · JPL |

== 125701–125800 ==
back to top

| Designation | | | Discovery | | | Properties | | Ref |
| Permanent | Provisional | Named after | Date | Site | Discoverer(s) | Category | Diam. | Ref |
|---|---|---|---|---|---|---|---|---|
| 125701 | 2001 XT_{94} | — | December 10, 2001 | Socorro | LINEAR | · | 2.1 km | MPC · JPL |
| 125702 | 2001 XS_{96} | — | December 10, 2001 | Socorro | LINEAR | · | 4.0 km | MPC · JPL |
| 125703 | 2001 XY_{96} | — | December 10, 2001 | Socorro | LINEAR | (5) | 2.4 km | MPC · JPL |
| 125704 | 2001 XB_{97} | — | December 10, 2001 | Socorro | LINEAR | · | 1.7 km | MPC · JPL |
| 125705 | 2001 XD_{97} | — | December 10, 2001 | Socorro | LINEAR | · | 2.8 km | MPC · JPL |
| 125706 | 2001 XZ_{97} | — | December 10, 2001 | Socorro | LINEAR | · | 3.3 km | MPC · JPL |
| 125707 | 2001 XZ_{98} | — | December 10, 2001 | Socorro | LINEAR | · | 3.0 km | MPC · JPL |
| 125708 | 2001 XD_{99} | — | December 10, 2001 | Socorro | LINEAR | ADE | 5.2 km | MPC · JPL |
| 125709 | 2001 XG_{99} | — | December 10, 2001 | Socorro | LINEAR | NYS | 2.6 km | MPC · JPL |
| 125710 | 2001 XJ_{99} | — | December 10, 2001 | Socorro | LINEAR | · | 2.7 km | MPC · JPL |
| 125711 | 2001 XG_{100} | — | December 10, 2001 | Socorro | LINEAR | · | 2.1 km | MPC · JPL |
| 125712 | 2001 XO_{100} | — | December 10, 2001 | Socorro | LINEAR | · | 2.2 km | MPC · JPL |
| 125713 | 2001 XP_{100} | — | December 10, 2001 | Socorro | LINEAR | · | 2.5 km | MPC · JPL |
| 125714 | 2001 XS_{100} | — | December 10, 2001 | Socorro | LINEAR | · | 3.0 km | MPC · JPL |
| 125715 | 2001 XZ_{100} | — | December 10, 2001 | Socorro | LINEAR | · | 2.6 km | MPC · JPL |
| 125716 | 2001 XT_{101} | — | December 10, 2001 | Socorro | LINEAR | · | 2.4 km | MPC · JPL |
| 125717 | 2001 XU_{101} | — | December 10, 2001 | Socorro | LINEAR | · | 1.8 km | MPC · JPL |
| 125718 Jemasalomon | 2001 XH_{105} | Jemasalomon | December 15, 2001 | Buthiers | J.-C. Merlin | · | 3.2 km | MPC · JPL |
| 125719 | 2001 XQ_{105} | — | December 14, 2001 | Uccle | H. M. J. Boffin | · | 1.9 km | MPC · JPL |
| 125720 | 2001 XK_{106} | — | December 10, 2001 | Socorro | LINEAR | V | 1.3 km | MPC · JPL |
| 125721 | 2001 XS_{106} | — | December 10, 2001 | Socorro | LINEAR | · | 3.7 km | MPC · JPL |
| 125722 | 2001 XL_{107} | — | December 10, 2001 | Socorro | LINEAR | NYS | 2.7 km | MPC · JPL |
| 125723 | 2001 XA_{108} | — | December 10, 2001 | Socorro | LINEAR | · | 4.3 km | MPC · JPL |
| 125724 | 2001 XK_{108} | — | December 10, 2001 | Socorro | LINEAR | (5) | 1.9 km | MPC · JPL |
| 125725 | 2001 XA_{109} | — | December 10, 2001 | Socorro | LINEAR | · | 1.7 km | MPC · JPL |
| 125726 | 2001 XQ_{110} | — | December 11, 2001 | Socorro | LINEAR | V | 1.2 km | MPC · JPL |
| 125727 | 2001 XC_{111} | — | December 11, 2001 | Socorro | LINEAR | · | 1.4 km | MPC · JPL |
| 125728 | 2001 XJ_{111} | — | December 11, 2001 | Socorro | LINEAR | · | 3.0 km | MPC · JPL |
| 125729 | 2001 XM_{111} | — | December 11, 2001 | Socorro | LINEAR | · | 3.6 km | MPC · JPL |
| 125730 | 2001 XV_{111} | — | December 11, 2001 | Socorro | LINEAR | · | 1.5 km | MPC · JPL |
| 125731 | 2001 XK_{112} | — | December 11, 2001 | Socorro | LINEAR | · | 2.7 km | MPC · JPL |
| 125732 | 2001 XN_{112} | — | December 11, 2001 | Socorro | LINEAR | · | 1.6 km | MPC · JPL |
| 125733 | 2001 XO_{113} | — | December 11, 2001 | Socorro | LINEAR | · | 2.0 km | MPC · JPL |
| 125734 | 2001 XZ_{114} | — | December 13, 2001 | Socorro | LINEAR | V | 1.2 km | MPC · JPL |
| 125735 | 2001 XD_{115} | — | December 13, 2001 | Socorro | LINEAR | · | 2.2 km | MPC · JPL |
| 125736 | 2001 XJ_{115} | — | December 13, 2001 | Socorro | LINEAR | · | 3.3 km | MPC · JPL |
| 125737 | 2001 XB_{116} | — | December 13, 2001 | Socorro | LINEAR | MAR | 2.2 km | MPC · JPL |
| 125738 | 2001 XE_{116} | — | December 13, 2001 | Socorro | LINEAR | · | 2.6 km | MPC · JPL |
| 125739 | 2001 XH_{116} | — | December 13, 2001 | Socorro | LINEAR | · | 1.9 km | MPC · JPL |
| 125740 | 2001 XD_{117} | — | December 13, 2001 | Socorro | LINEAR | · | 1.9 km | MPC · JPL |
| 125741 | 2001 XG_{117} | — | December 13, 2001 | Socorro | LINEAR | · | 2.1 km | MPC · JPL |
| 125742 | 2001 XT_{117} | — | December 13, 2001 | Socorro | LINEAR | · | 2.7 km | MPC · JPL |
| 125743 | 2001 XE_{118} | — | December 13, 2001 | Socorro | LINEAR | · | 2.3 km | MPC · JPL |
| 125744 | 2001 XY_{118} | — | December 13, 2001 | Socorro | LINEAR | · | 4.6 km | MPC · JPL |
| 125745 | 2001 XF_{119} | — | December 13, 2001 | Socorro | LINEAR | · | 4.0 km | MPC · JPL |
| 125746 | 2001 XJ_{119} | — | December 13, 2001 | Socorro | LINEAR | · | 1.5 km | MPC · JPL |
| 125747 | 2001 XT_{120} | — | December 14, 2001 | Socorro | LINEAR | · | 1.3 km | MPC · JPL |
| 125748 | 2001 XH_{121} | — | December 14, 2001 | Socorro | LINEAR | · | 2.2 km | MPC · JPL |
| 125749 | 2001 XT_{121} | — | December 14, 2001 | Socorro | LINEAR | BAP | 1.7 km | MPC · JPL |
| 125750 | 2001 XJ_{122} | — | December 14, 2001 | Socorro | LINEAR | · | 1.9 km | MPC · JPL |
| 125751 | 2001 XQ_{122} | — | December 14, 2001 | Socorro | LINEAR | · | 3.7 km | MPC · JPL |
| 125752 | 2001 XD_{123} | — | December 14, 2001 | Socorro | LINEAR | · | 2.9 km | MPC · JPL |
| 125753 | 2001 XX_{123} | — | December 14, 2001 | Socorro | LINEAR | · | 1.5 km | MPC · JPL |
| 125754 | 2001 XG_{127} | — | December 14, 2001 | Socorro | LINEAR | · | 2.1 km | MPC · JPL |
| 125755 | 2001 XY_{127} | — | December 14, 2001 | Socorro | LINEAR | · | 1.6 km | MPC · JPL |
| 125756 | 2001 XU_{128} | — | December 14, 2001 | Socorro | LINEAR | · | 1.4 km | MPC · JPL |
| 125757 | 2001 XA_{129} | — | December 14, 2001 | Socorro | LINEAR | KOR | 2.1 km | MPC · JPL |
| 125758 | 2001 XY_{129} | — | December 14, 2001 | Socorro | LINEAR | SUL | 3.9 km | MPC · JPL |
| 125759 | 2001 XH_{130} | — | December 14, 2001 | Socorro | LINEAR | · | 2.1 km | MPC · JPL |
| 125760 | 2001 XN_{131} | — | December 14, 2001 | Socorro | LINEAR | · | 1.8 km | MPC · JPL |
| 125761 | 2001 XQ_{131} | — | December 14, 2001 | Socorro | LINEAR | · | 2.4 km | MPC · JPL |
| 125762 | 2001 XY_{134} | — | December 14, 2001 | Socorro | LINEAR | · | 2.4 km | MPC · JPL |
| 125763 | 2001 XC_{136} | — | December 14, 2001 | Socorro | LINEAR | · | 1.4 km | MPC · JPL |
| 125764 | 2001 XG_{136} | — | December 14, 2001 | Socorro | LINEAR | · | 2.4 km | MPC · JPL |
| 125765 | 2001 XO_{136} | — | December 14, 2001 | Socorro | LINEAR | · | 2.0 km | MPC · JPL |
| 125766 | 2001 XS_{136} | — | December 14, 2001 | Socorro | LINEAR | · | 2.0 km | MPC · JPL |
| 125767 | 2001 XZ_{136} | — | December 14, 2001 | Socorro | LINEAR | · | 2.6 km | MPC · JPL |
| 125768 | 2001 XD_{137} | — | December 14, 2001 | Socorro | LINEAR | (5) | 2.1 km | MPC · JPL |
| 125769 | 2001 XY_{137} | — | December 14, 2001 | Socorro | LINEAR | · | 1.5 km | MPC · JPL |
| 125770 | 2001 XA_{138} | — | December 14, 2001 | Socorro | LINEAR | · | 2.7 km | MPC · JPL |
| 125771 | 2001 XM_{138} | — | December 14, 2001 | Socorro | LINEAR | · | 2.6 km | MPC · JPL |
| 125772 | 2001 XY_{138} | — | December 14, 2001 | Socorro | LINEAR | · | 5.2 km | MPC · JPL |
| 125773 | 2001 XA_{140} | — | December 14, 2001 | Socorro | LINEAR | V | 1.2 km | MPC · JPL |
| 125774 | 2001 XJ_{140} | — | December 14, 2001 | Socorro | LINEAR | · | 2.6 km | MPC · JPL |
| 125775 | 2001 XQ_{140} | — | December 14, 2001 | Socorro | LINEAR | (2076) | 1.6 km | MPC · JPL |
| 125776 | 2001 XX_{140} | — | December 14, 2001 | Socorro | LINEAR | · | 1.9 km | MPC · JPL |
| 125777 | 2001 XV_{143} | — | December 14, 2001 | Socorro | LINEAR | · | 1.5 km | MPC · JPL |
| 125778 | 2001 XV_{144} | — | December 14, 2001 | Socorro | LINEAR | · | 1.8 km | MPC · JPL |
| 125779 | 2001 XL_{145} | — | December 14, 2001 | Socorro | LINEAR | · | 3.8 km | MPC · JPL |
| 125780 | 2001 XM_{145} | — | December 14, 2001 | Socorro | LINEAR | · | 1.6 km | MPC · JPL |
| 125781 | 2001 XO_{145} | — | December 14, 2001 | Socorro | LINEAR | · | 2.0 km | MPC · JPL |
| 125782 | 2001 XW_{146} | — | December 14, 2001 | Socorro | LINEAR | · | 1.2 km | MPC · JPL |
| 125783 | 2001 XD_{147} | — | December 14, 2001 | Socorro | LINEAR | · | 3.2 km | MPC · JPL |
| 125784 | 2001 XZ_{147} | — | December 14, 2001 | Socorro | LINEAR | · | 3.0 km | MPC · JPL |
| 125785 | 2001 XX_{148} | — | December 14, 2001 | Socorro | LINEAR | V | 1.2 km | MPC · JPL |
| 125786 | 2001 XR_{150} | — | December 14, 2001 | Socorro | LINEAR | · | 3.2 km | MPC · JPL |
| 125787 | 2001 XY_{150} | — | December 14, 2001 | Socorro | LINEAR | EUN · slow | 2.1 km | MPC · JPL |
| 125788 | 2001 XH_{151} | — | December 14, 2001 | Socorro | LINEAR | · | 2.3 km | MPC · JPL |
| 125789 | 2001 XY_{151} | — | December 14, 2001 | Socorro | LINEAR | · | 1.9 km | MPC · JPL |
| 125790 | 2001 XB_{152} | — | December 14, 2001 | Socorro | LINEAR | · | 2.1 km | MPC · JPL |
| 125791 | 2001 XJ_{152} | — | December 14, 2001 | Socorro | LINEAR | · | 3.9 km | MPC · JPL |
| 125792 | 2001 XL_{152} | — | December 14, 2001 | Socorro | LINEAR | · | 1.9 km | MPC · JPL |
| 125793 | 2001 XC_{153} | — | December 14, 2001 | Socorro | LINEAR | MAS | 1.5 km | MPC · JPL |
| 125794 | 2001 XV_{153} | — | December 14, 2001 | Socorro | LINEAR | AST | 2.9 km | MPC · JPL |
| 125795 | 2001 XW_{153} | — | December 14, 2001 | Socorro | LINEAR | · | 2.9 km | MPC · JPL |
| 125796 | 2001 XH_{154} | — | December 14, 2001 | Socorro | LINEAR | · | 2.4 km | MPC · JPL |
| 125797 | 2001 XN_{155} | — | December 14, 2001 | Socorro | LINEAR | NYS | 2.2 km | MPC · JPL |
| 125798 | 2001 XY_{155} | — | December 14, 2001 | Socorro | LINEAR | · | 2.0 km | MPC · JPL |
| 125799 | 2001 XU_{156} | — | December 14, 2001 | Socorro | LINEAR | · | 2.5 km | MPC · JPL |
| 125800 | 2001 XX_{156} | — | December 14, 2001 | Socorro | LINEAR | (5) | 1.4 km | MPC · JPL |

== 125801–125900 ==
back to top

| Designation | | | Discovery | | | Properties | | Ref |
| Permanent | Provisional | Named after | Date | Site | Discoverer(s) | Category | Diam. | Ref |
|---|---|---|---|---|---|---|---|---|
| 125801 | 2001 XO_{157} | — | December 14, 2001 | Socorro | LINEAR | V | 1.8 km | MPC · JPL |
| 125802 | 2001 XS_{157} | — | December 14, 2001 | Socorro | LINEAR | V | 1.4 km | MPC · JPL |
| 125803 | 2001 XF_{158} | — | December 14, 2001 | Socorro | LINEAR | · | 2.3 km | MPC · JPL |
| 125804 | 2001 XQ_{158} | — | December 14, 2001 | Socorro | LINEAR | · | 2.8 km | MPC · JPL |
| 125805 | 2001 XR_{158} | — | December 14, 2001 | Socorro | LINEAR | · | 940 m | MPC · JPL |
| 125806 | 2001 XC_{159} | — | December 14, 2001 | Socorro | LINEAR | · | 2.1 km | MPC · JPL |
| 125807 | 2001 XB_{160} | — | December 14, 2001 | Socorro | LINEAR | V | 1.4 km | MPC · JPL |
| 125808 | 2001 XR_{160} | — | December 14, 2001 | Socorro | LINEAR | · | 1.6 km | MPC · JPL |
| 125809 | 2001 XA_{161} | — | December 14, 2001 | Socorro | LINEAR | · | 2.9 km | MPC · JPL |
| 125810 | 2001 XF_{162} | — | December 14, 2001 | Socorro | LINEAR | · | 1.6 km | MPC · JPL |
| 125811 | 2001 XP_{162} | — | December 14, 2001 | Socorro | LINEAR | · | 2.9 km | MPC · JPL |
| 125812 | 2001 XD_{163} | — | December 14, 2001 | Socorro | LINEAR | · | 1.8 km | MPC · JPL |
| 125813 | 2001 XN_{164} | — | December 14, 2001 | Socorro | LINEAR | NYS | 2.6 km | MPC · JPL |
| 125814 | 2001 XQ_{164} | — | December 14, 2001 | Socorro | LINEAR | (5) | 3.4 km | MPC · JPL |
| 125815 | 2001 XD_{165} | — | December 14, 2001 | Socorro | LINEAR | · | 2.5 km | MPC · JPL |
| 125816 | 2001 XC_{166} | — | December 14, 2001 | Socorro | LINEAR | · | 2.8 km | MPC · JPL |
| 125817 | 2001 XO_{167} | — | December 14, 2001 | Socorro | LINEAR | · | 2.3 km | MPC · JPL |
| 125818 | 2001 XL_{168} | — | December 14, 2001 | Socorro | LINEAR | · | 4.3 km | MPC · JPL |
| 125819 | 2001 XO_{169} | — | December 14, 2001 | Socorro | LINEAR | NYS | 2.5 km | MPC · JPL |
| 125820 | 2001 XO_{170} | — | December 14, 2001 | Socorro | LINEAR | NYS | 1.7 km | MPC · JPL |
| 125821 | 2001 XU_{170} | — | December 14, 2001 | Socorro | LINEAR | · | 1.3 km | MPC · JPL |
| 125822 | 2001 XB_{171} | — | December 14, 2001 | Socorro | LINEAR | · | 4.7 km | MPC · JPL |
| 125823 | 2001 XD_{172} | — | December 14, 2001 | Socorro | LINEAR | · | 1.5 km | MPC · JPL |
| 125824 | 2001 XP_{172} | — | December 14, 2001 | Socorro | LINEAR | · | 3.2 km | MPC · JPL |
| 125825 | 2001 XQ_{173} | — | December 14, 2001 | Socorro | LINEAR | · | 2.8 km | MPC · JPL |
| 125826 | 2001 XU_{173} | — | December 14, 2001 | Socorro | LINEAR | · | 2.3 km | MPC · JPL |
| 125827 | 2001 XP_{174} | — | December 14, 2001 | Socorro | LINEAR | · | 2.0 km | MPC · JPL |
| 125828 | 2001 XT_{174} | — | December 14, 2001 | Socorro | LINEAR | · | 1.9 km | MPC · JPL |
| 125829 | 2001 XW_{174} | — | December 14, 2001 | Socorro | LINEAR | · | 2.5 km | MPC · JPL |
| 125830 | 2001 XG_{175} | — | December 14, 2001 | Socorro | LINEAR | · | 2.5 km | MPC · JPL |
| 125831 | 2001 XU_{176} | — | December 14, 2001 | Socorro | LINEAR | · | 2.3 km | MPC · JPL |
| 125832 | 2001 XG_{177} | — | December 14, 2001 | Socorro | LINEAR | · | 1.6 km | MPC · JPL |
| 125833 | 2001 XW_{179} | — | December 14, 2001 | Socorro | LINEAR | · | 4.8 km | MPC · JPL |
| 125834 | 2001 XA_{180} | — | December 14, 2001 | Socorro | LINEAR | NYS | 3.0 km | MPC · JPL |
| 125835 | 2001 XJ_{180} | — | December 14, 2001 | Socorro | LINEAR | · | 2.2 km | MPC · JPL |
| 125836 | 2001 XL_{180} | — | December 14, 2001 | Socorro | LINEAR | · | 3.5 km | MPC · JPL |
| 125837 | 2001 XZ_{180} | — | December 14, 2001 | Socorro | LINEAR | · | 1.1 km | MPC · JPL |
| 125838 | 2001 XC_{181} | — | December 14, 2001 | Socorro | LINEAR | NYS | 2.0 km | MPC · JPL |
| 125839 | 2001 XX_{181} | — | December 14, 2001 | Socorro | LINEAR | · | 2.7 km | MPC · JPL |
| 125840 | 2001 XB_{182} | — | December 14, 2001 | Socorro | LINEAR | · | 2.9 km | MPC · JPL |
| 125841 | 2001 XO_{182} | — | December 14, 2001 | Socorro | LINEAR | · | 3.0 km | MPC · JPL |
| 125842 | 2001 XQ_{182} | — | December 14, 2001 | Socorro | LINEAR | · | 4.5 km | MPC · JPL |
| 125843 | 2001 XD_{183} | — | December 14, 2001 | Socorro | LINEAR | NYS | 2.0 km | MPC · JPL |
| 125844 | 2001 XF_{183} | — | December 14, 2001 | Socorro | LINEAR | MAS | 1.2 km | MPC · JPL |
| 125845 | 2001 XO_{183} | — | December 14, 2001 | Socorro | LINEAR | · | 7.9 km | MPC · JPL |
| 125846 | 2001 XR_{183} | — | December 14, 2001 | Socorro | LINEAR | · | 2.6 km | MPC · JPL |
| 125847 | 2001 XT_{183} | — | December 14, 2001 | Socorro | LINEAR | · | 2.1 km | MPC · JPL |
| 125848 | 2001 XE_{184} | — | December 14, 2001 | Socorro | LINEAR | · | 2.4 km | MPC · JPL |
| 125849 | 2001 XH_{184} | — | December 14, 2001 | Socorro | LINEAR | · | 1.5 km | MPC · JPL |
| 125850 | 2001 XM_{184} | — | December 14, 2001 | Socorro | LINEAR | · | 3.3 km | MPC · JPL |
| 125851 | 2001 XC_{185} | — | December 14, 2001 | Socorro | LINEAR | NYS | 1.8 km | MPC · JPL |
| 125852 | 2001 XF_{186} | — | December 14, 2001 | Socorro | LINEAR | · | 2.9 km | MPC · JPL |
| 125853 | 2001 XC_{187} | — | December 14, 2001 | Socorro | LINEAR | · | 2.4 km | MPC · JPL |
| 125854 | 2001 XN_{187} | — | December 14, 2001 | Socorro | LINEAR | · | 1.5 km | MPC · JPL |
| 125855 | 2001 XS_{187} | — | December 14, 2001 | Socorro | LINEAR | · | 2.6 km | MPC · JPL |
| 125856 | 2001 XR_{188} | — | December 14, 2001 | Socorro | LINEAR | · | 2.6 km | MPC · JPL |
| 125857 | 2001 XX_{188} | — | December 14, 2001 | Socorro | LINEAR | · | 3.3 km | MPC · JPL |
| 125858 | 2001 XO_{189} | — | December 14, 2001 | Socorro | LINEAR | · | 2.2 km | MPC · JPL |
| 125859 | 2001 XV_{189} | — | December 14, 2001 | Socorro | LINEAR | NYS | 1.8 km | MPC · JPL |
| 125860 | 2001 XZ_{189} | — | December 14, 2001 | Socorro | LINEAR | · | 3.7 km | MPC · JPL |
| 125861 | 2001 XE_{190} | — | December 14, 2001 | Socorro | LINEAR | NEM | 3.8 km | MPC · JPL |
| 125862 | 2001 XA_{191} | — | December 14, 2001 | Socorro | LINEAR | · | 2.8 km | MPC · JPL |
| 125863 | 2001 XK_{191} | — | December 14, 2001 | Socorro | LINEAR | PHO | 2.3 km | MPC · JPL |
| 125864 | 2001 XR_{191} | — | December 14, 2001 | Socorro | LINEAR | · | 2.5 km | MPC · JPL |
| 125865 | 2001 XW_{191} | — | December 14, 2001 | Socorro | LINEAR | · | 2.1 km | MPC · JPL |
| 125866 | 2001 XZ_{191} | — | December 14, 2001 | Socorro | LINEAR | fast | 3.7 km | MPC · JPL |
| 125867 | 2001 XA_{192} | — | December 14, 2001 | Socorro | LINEAR | NYS | 1.8 km | MPC · JPL |
| 125868 | 2001 XF_{192} | — | December 14, 2001 | Socorro | LINEAR | · | 1.8 km | MPC · JPL |
| 125869 | 2001 XW_{193} | — | December 14, 2001 | Socorro | LINEAR | · | 1.8 km | MPC · JPL |
| 125870 | 2001 XW_{194} | — | December 14, 2001 | Socorro | LINEAR | · | 2.9 km | MPC · JPL |
| 125871 | 2001 XA_{195} | — | December 14, 2001 | Socorro | LINEAR | fast | 2.0 km | MPC · JPL |
| 125872 | 2001 XB_{195} | — | December 14, 2001 | Socorro | LINEAR | NYS | 3.1 km | MPC · JPL |
| 125873 | 2001 XF_{195} | — | December 14, 2001 | Socorro | LINEAR | · | 3.4 km | MPC · JPL |
| 125874 | 2001 XC_{196} | — | December 14, 2001 | Socorro | LINEAR | · | 2.4 km | MPC · JPL |
| 125875 | 2001 XJ_{196} | — | December 14, 2001 | Socorro | LINEAR | · | 2.1 km | MPC · JPL |
| 125876 | 2001 XT_{197} | — | December 14, 2001 | Socorro | LINEAR | · | 1.8 km | MPC · JPL |
| 125877 | 2001 XV_{197} | — | December 14, 2001 | Socorro | LINEAR | EUN | 2.0 km | MPC · JPL |
| 125878 | 2001 XR_{198} | — | December 14, 2001 | Socorro | LINEAR | · | 3.3 km | MPC · JPL |
| 125879 | 2001 XG_{199} | — | December 14, 2001 | Socorro | LINEAR | (5) | 1.9 km | MPC · JPL |
| 125880 | 2001 XF_{201} | — | December 9, 2001 | Bergisch Gladbach | W. Bickel | · | 2.1 km | MPC · JPL |
| 125881 | 2001 XK_{202} | — | December 11, 2001 | Socorro | LINEAR | · | 1.3 km | MPC · JPL |
| 125882 | 2001 XN_{202} | — | December 11, 2001 | Socorro | LINEAR | · | 2.2 km | MPC · JPL |
| 125883 | 2001 XQ_{205} | — | December 11, 2001 | Socorro | LINEAR | V | 1.4 km | MPC · JPL |
| 125884 | 2001 XP_{207} | — | December 11, 2001 | Socorro | LINEAR | · | 1.4 km | MPC · JPL |
| 125885 | 2001 XE_{208} | — | December 11, 2001 | Socorro | LINEAR | · | 2.0 km | MPC · JPL |
| 125886 | 2001 XS_{208} | — | December 11, 2001 | Socorro | LINEAR | · | 2.0 km | MPC · JPL |
| 125887 | 2001 XH_{209} | — | December 11, 2001 | Socorro | LINEAR | · | 2.9 km | MPC · JPL |
| 125888 | 2001 XK_{209} | — | December 11, 2001 | Socorro | LINEAR | · | 3.5 km | MPC · JPL |
| 125889 | 2001 XM_{209} | — | December 11, 2001 | Socorro | LINEAR | ADE | 2.8 km | MPC · JPL |
| 125890 | 2001 XD_{210} | — | December 11, 2001 | Socorro | LINEAR | · | 4.1 km | MPC · JPL |
| 125891 | 2001 XL_{210} | — | December 11, 2001 | Socorro | LINEAR | (2076) | 1.3 km | MPC · JPL |
| 125892 | 2001 XL_{212} | — | December 11, 2001 | Socorro | LINEAR | · | 2.6 km | MPC · JPL |
| 125893 | 2001 XM_{212} | — | December 11, 2001 | Socorro | LINEAR | · | 2.2 km | MPC · JPL |
| 125894 | 2001 XU_{212} | — | December 11, 2001 | Socorro | LINEAR | · | 2.7 km | MPC · JPL |
| 125895 | 2001 XX_{212} | — | December 11, 2001 | Socorro | LINEAR | · | 2.4 km | MPC · JPL |
| 125896 | 2001 XG_{213} | — | December 11, 2001 | Socorro | LINEAR | · | 2.2 km | MPC · JPL |
| 125897 | 2001 XK_{214} | — | December 11, 2001 | Socorro | LINEAR | · | 1.9 km | MPC · JPL |
| 125898 | 2001 XU_{215} | — | December 14, 2001 | Socorro | LINEAR | · | 1.9 km | MPC · JPL |
| 125899 | 2001 XT_{216} | — | December 14, 2001 | Socorro | LINEAR | · | 1.7 km | MPC · JPL |
| 125900 | 2001 XY_{216} | — | December 14, 2001 | Socorro | LINEAR | PHO | 2.1 km | MPC · JPL |

== 125901–126000 ==
back to top

| Designation | | | Discovery | | | Properties | | Ref |
| Permanent | Provisional | Named after | Date | Site | Discoverer(s) | Category | Diam. | Ref |
|---|---|---|---|---|---|---|---|---|
| 125901 | 2001 XE_{217} | — | December 14, 2001 | Socorro | LINEAR | V | 1.3 km | MPC · JPL |
| 125902 | 2001 XF_{218} | — | December 15, 2001 | Socorro | LINEAR | EUN | 2.3 km | MPC · JPL |
| 125903 | 2001 XM_{218} | — | December 15, 2001 | Socorro | LINEAR | · | 1.2 km | MPC · JPL |
| 125904 | 2001 XR_{218} | — | December 15, 2001 | Socorro | LINEAR | · | 1.4 km | MPC · JPL |
| 125905 | 2001 XV_{218} | — | December 15, 2001 | Socorro | LINEAR | · | 2.9 km | MPC · JPL |
| 125906 | 2001 XZ_{218} | — | December 15, 2001 | Socorro | LINEAR | (5) | 1.5 km | MPC · JPL |
| 125907 | 2001 XQ_{219} | — | December 15, 2001 | Socorro | LINEAR | · | 1.2 km | MPC · JPL |
| 125908 | 2001 XE_{220} | — | December 15, 2001 | Socorro | LINEAR | NYS · | 3.2 km | MPC · JPL |
| 125909 | 2001 XM_{221} | — | December 15, 2001 | Socorro | LINEAR | · | 2.5 km | MPC · JPL |
| 125910 | 2001 XX_{221} | — | December 15, 2001 | Socorro | LINEAR | · | 1.7 km | MPC · JPL |
| 125911 | 2001 XO_{223} | — | December 15, 2001 | Socorro | LINEAR | PHO | 2.0 km | MPC · JPL |
| 125912 | 2001 XJ_{224} | — | December 15, 2001 | Socorro | LINEAR | V | 1.2 km | MPC · JPL |
| 125913 | 2001 XS_{225} | — | December 15, 2001 | Socorro | LINEAR | · | 2.3 km | MPC · JPL |
| 125914 | 2001 XY_{225} | — | December 15, 2001 | Socorro | LINEAR | · | 1.5 km | MPC · JPL |
| 125915 | 2001 XA_{227} | — | December 15, 2001 | Socorro | LINEAR | · | 2.3 km | MPC · JPL |
| 125916 | 2001 XE_{227} | — | December 15, 2001 | Socorro | LINEAR | · | 2.6 km | MPC · JPL |
| 125917 | 2001 XD_{228} | — | December 15, 2001 | Socorro | LINEAR | · | 3.1 km | MPC · JPL |
| 125918 | 2001 XG_{229} | — | December 15, 2001 | Socorro | LINEAR | NYS · | 3.0 km | MPC · JPL |
| 125919 | 2001 XA_{230} | — | December 15, 2001 | Socorro | LINEAR | · | 2.7 km | MPC · JPL |
| 125920 | 2001 XE_{231} | — | December 15, 2001 | Socorro | LINEAR | · | 4.0 km | MPC · JPL |
| 125921 | 2001 XG_{231} | — | December 15, 2001 | Socorro | LINEAR | · | 2.3 km | MPC · JPL |
| 125922 | 2001 XR_{234} | — | December 15, 2001 | Socorro | LINEAR | MRX | 1.8 km | MPC · JPL |
| 125923 | 2001 XW_{235} | — | December 15, 2001 | Socorro | LINEAR | · | 1.7 km | MPC · JPL |
| 125924 | 2001 XG_{236} | — | December 15, 2001 | Socorro | LINEAR | NYS · | 5.0 km | MPC · JPL |
| 125925 | 2001 XE_{237} | — | December 15, 2001 | Socorro | LINEAR | · | 1.8 km | MPC · JPL |
| 125926 | 2001 XM_{237} | — | December 15, 2001 | Socorro | LINEAR | · | 1.3 km | MPC · JPL |
| 125927 | 2001 XD_{238} | — | December 15, 2001 | Socorro | LINEAR | · | 2.1 km | MPC · JPL |
| 125928 | 2001 XE_{238} | — | December 15, 2001 | Socorro | LINEAR | NYS | 2.5 km | MPC · JPL |
| 125929 | 2001 XH_{238} | — | December 15, 2001 | Socorro | LINEAR | (5) | 2.7 km | MPC · JPL |
| 125930 | 2001 XP_{238} | — | December 15, 2001 | Socorro | LINEAR | · | 2.5 km | MPC · JPL |
| 125931 | 2001 XX_{238} | — | December 15, 2001 | Socorro | LINEAR | · | 2.1 km | MPC · JPL |
| 125932 | 2001 XE_{239} | — | December 15, 2001 | Socorro | LINEAR | NYS | 2.3 km | MPC · JPL |
| 125933 | 2001 XM_{239} | — | December 15, 2001 | Socorro | LINEAR | MAS | 1.2 km | MPC · JPL |
| 125934 | 2001 XP_{239} | — | December 15, 2001 | Socorro | LINEAR | · | 2.3 km | MPC · JPL |
| 125935 | 2001 XT_{239} | — | December 15, 2001 | Socorro | LINEAR | · | 2.2 km | MPC · JPL |
| 125936 | 2001 XX_{239} | — | December 15, 2001 | Socorro | LINEAR | NYS | 2.1 km | MPC · JPL |
| 125937 | 2001 XF_{240} | — | December 15, 2001 | Socorro | LINEAR | EUN | 3.2 km | MPC · JPL |
| 125938 | 2001 XP_{240} | — | December 15, 2001 | Socorro | LINEAR | · | 2.9 km | MPC · JPL |
| 125939 | 2001 XT_{240} | — | December 15, 2001 | Socorro | LINEAR | · | 2.0 km | MPC · JPL |
| 125940 | 2001 XU_{240} | — | December 15, 2001 | Socorro | LINEAR | · | 2.0 km | MPC · JPL |
| 125941 | 2001 XC_{241} | — | December 15, 2001 | Socorro | LINEAR | · | 3.0 km | MPC · JPL |
| 125942 | 2001 XG_{241} | — | December 13, 2001 | Socorro | LINEAR | (1547) | 3.7 km | MPC · JPL |
| 125943 | 2001 XB_{243} | — | December 14, 2001 | Socorro | LINEAR | · | 2.7 km | MPC · JPL |
| 125944 | 2001 XC_{243} | — | December 14, 2001 | Socorro | LINEAR | MAS | 1.1 km | MPC · JPL |
| 125945 | 2001 XP_{243} | — | December 14, 2001 | Socorro | LINEAR | · | 3.5 km | MPC · JPL |
| 125946 | 2001 XJ_{245} | — | December 15, 2001 | Socorro | LINEAR | · | 2.8 km | MPC · JPL |
| 125947 | 2001 XX_{250} | — | December 14, 2001 | Socorro | LINEAR | MAS | 1.2 km | MPC · JPL |
| 125948 | 2001 XH_{251} | — | December 14, 2001 | Socorro | LINEAR | · | 2.4 km | MPC · JPL |
| 125949 | 2001 XF_{252} | — | December 14, 2001 | Socorro | LINEAR | · | 2.1 km | MPC · JPL |
| 125950 | 2001 XG_{252} | — | December 14, 2001 | Socorro | LINEAR | · | 3.0 km | MPC · JPL |
| 125951 | 2001 XF_{253} | — | December 14, 2001 | Socorro | LINEAR | · | 2.0 km | MPC · JPL |
| 125952 | 2001 XP_{258} | — | December 8, 2001 | Anderson Mesa | LONEOS | (2076) | 1.9 km | MPC · JPL |
| 125953 | 2001 XH_{259} | — | December 8, 2001 | Anderson Mesa | LONEOS | V | 950 m | MPC · JPL |
| 125954 | 2001 XL_{259} | — | December 8, 2001 | Anderson Mesa | LONEOS | PHO | 2.1 km | MPC · JPL |
| 125955 | 2001 XO_{261} | — | December 11, 2001 | Socorro | LINEAR | · | 2.9 km | MPC · JPL |
| 125956 | 2001 XR_{262} | — | December 13, 2001 | Palomar | NEAT | · | 1.2 km | MPC · JPL |
| 125957 | 2001 XE_{264} | — | December 14, 2001 | Palomar | NEAT | · | 1.8 km | MPC · JPL |
| 125958 | 2001 XK_{264} | — | December 14, 2001 | Palomar | NEAT | · | 2.0 km | MPC · JPL |
| 125959 | 2001 XL_{264} | — | December 14, 2001 | Palomar | NEAT | · | 1.6 km | MPC · JPL |
| 125960 | 2001 XE_{265} | — | December 14, 2001 | Socorro | LINEAR | · | 2.9 km | MPC · JPL |
| 125961 | 2001 XP_{266} | — | December 13, 2001 | Palomar | NEAT | · | 2.5 km | MPC · JPL |
| 125962 | 2001 YD_{6} | — | December 17, 2001 | Palomar | NEAT | MAS | 1.3 km | MPC · JPL |
| 125963 | 2001 YO_{7} | — | December 17, 2001 | Socorro | LINEAR | · | 2.3 km | MPC · JPL |
| 125964 | 2001 YU_{7} | — | December 17, 2001 | Socorro | LINEAR | · | 2.2 km | MPC · JPL |
| 125965 | 2001 YX_{7} | — | December 17, 2001 | Socorro | LINEAR | V | 1.1 km | MPC · JPL |
| 125966 | 2001 YD_{11} | — | December 17, 2001 | Socorro | LINEAR | · | 3.4 km | MPC · JPL |
| 125967 | 2001 YG_{11} | — | December 17, 2001 | Socorro | LINEAR | · | 1.7 km | MPC · JPL |
| 125968 | 2001 YR_{11} | — | December 18, 2001 | Socorro | LINEAR | · | 2.5 km | MPC · JPL |
| 125969 | 2001 YL_{13} | — | December 17, 2001 | Socorro | LINEAR | fast | 1.3 km | MPC · JPL |
| 125970 | 2001 YS_{15} | — | December 17, 2001 | Socorro | LINEAR | · | 2.5 km | MPC · JPL |
| 125971 | 2001 YW_{15} | — | December 17, 2001 | Socorro | LINEAR | · | 1.8 km | MPC · JPL |
| 125972 | 2001 YX_{15} | — | December 17, 2001 | Socorro | LINEAR | NYS | 1.8 km | MPC · JPL |
| 125973 | 2001 YA_{17} | — | December 17, 2001 | Socorro | LINEAR | · | 1.4 km | MPC · JPL |
| 125974 | 2001 YY_{18} | — | December 17, 2001 | Socorro | LINEAR | · | 2.0 km | MPC · JPL |
| 125975 | 2001 YD_{19} | — | December 17, 2001 | Socorro | LINEAR | KOR | 2.1 km | MPC · JPL |
| 125976 | 2001 YR_{20} | — | December 18, 2001 | Socorro | LINEAR | · | 3.9 km | MPC · JPL |
| 125977 | 2001 YF_{21} | — | December 18, 2001 | Socorro | LINEAR | MAS | 1.1 km | MPC · JPL |
| 125978 | 2001 YJ_{21} | — | December 18, 2001 | Socorro | LINEAR | · | 2.2 km | MPC · JPL |
| 125979 | 2001 YU_{21} | — | December 18, 2001 | Socorro | LINEAR | · | 1.2 km | MPC · JPL |
| 125980 | 2001 YV_{21} | — | December 18, 2001 | Socorro | LINEAR | · | 3.1 km | MPC · JPL |
| 125981 | 2001 YB_{22} | — | December 18, 2001 | Socorro | LINEAR | · | 1.9 km | MPC · JPL |
| 125982 | 2001 YC_{22} | — | December 18, 2001 | Socorro | LINEAR | · | 2.3 km | MPC · JPL |
| 125983 | 2001 YH_{25} | — | December 18, 2001 | Socorro | LINEAR | · | 1.9 km | MPC · JPL |
| 125984 | 2001 YM_{25} | — | December 18, 2001 | Socorro | LINEAR | · | 2.7 km | MPC · JPL |
| 125985 | 2001 YX_{25} | — | December 18, 2001 | Socorro | LINEAR | · | 2.0 km | MPC · JPL |
| 125986 | 2001 YF_{27} | — | December 18, 2001 | Socorro | LINEAR | (5) | 1.9 km | MPC · JPL |
| 125987 | 2001 YD_{29} | — | December 18, 2001 | Socorro | LINEAR | · | 2.8 km | MPC · JPL |
| 125988 | 2001 YX_{30} | — | December 18, 2001 | Socorro | LINEAR | PAD | 3.1 km | MPC · JPL |
| 125989 | 2001 YA_{31} | — | December 18, 2001 | Socorro | LINEAR | · | 2.0 km | MPC · JPL |
| 125990 | 2001 YE_{33} | — | December 18, 2001 | Socorro | LINEAR | · | 2.8 km | MPC · JPL |
| 125991 | 2001 YN_{34} | — | December 18, 2001 | Socorro | LINEAR | MAS | 990 m | MPC · JPL |
| 125992 | 2001 YR_{36} | — | December 18, 2001 | Socorro | LINEAR | · | 1.6 km | MPC · JPL |
| 125993 | 2001 YH_{37} | — | December 18, 2001 | Socorro | LINEAR | NYS | 2.2 km | MPC · JPL |
| 125994 | 2001 YR_{38} | — | December 18, 2001 | Socorro | LINEAR | · | 2.1 km | MPC · JPL |
| 125995 | 2001 YK_{39} | — | December 18, 2001 | Socorro | LINEAR | NYS | 1.8 km | MPC · JPL |
| 125996 | 2001 YZ_{40} | — | December 18, 2001 | Socorro | LINEAR | (5) | 1.9 km | MPC · JPL |
| 125997 | 2001 YH_{42} | — | December 18, 2001 | Socorro | LINEAR | · | 3.3 km | MPC · JPL |
| 125998 | 2001 YR_{44} | — | December 18, 2001 | Socorro | LINEAR | · | 2.1 km | MPC · JPL |
| 125999 | 2001 YF_{45} | — | December 18, 2001 | Socorro | LINEAR | (5) | 2.7 km | MPC · JPL |
| 126000 | 2001 YS_{45} | — | December 18, 2001 | Socorro | LINEAR | · | 2.0 km | MPC · JPL |

back to top

== See also ==
- Meanings of minor-planet names: 125001–126000
