= Meanings of minor-planet names: 125001–126000 =

As minor planet discoveries are confirmed, they are given a permanent number by the IAU's Minor Planet Center (MPC), and the discoverers can then submit names for them, following the IAU's naming conventions. The list below concerns those minor planets in the specified number-range that have received names, and explains the meanings of those names.

Official naming citations of newly named small Solar System bodies are approved and published in a bulletin by IAU's Working Group for Small Bodies Nomenclature (WGSBN). Before May 2021, citations were published in MPC's Minor Planet Circulars for many decades. Recent citations can also be found on the JPL Small-Body Database (SBDB). Until his death in 2016, German astronomer Lutz D. Schmadel compiled these citations into the Dictionary of Minor Planet Names (DMP) and regularly updated the collection.

Based on Paul Herget's The Names of the Minor Planets, Schmadel also researched the unclear origin of numerous asteroids, most of which had been named prior to World War II. This article incorporates text from this source, which is in the public domain: SBDB New namings may only be added to this list below after official publication as the preannouncement of names is condemned. The WGSBN publishes a comprehensive guideline for the naming rules of non-cometary small Solar System bodies.

== 125001–125100 ==
Named minor planet	Provisional	This minor planet was named for...	Ref · Catalog
125071 Lugosi	2001 TX_{242}	Béla Lugosi (1883–1956), Hungarian actor known for his portrayal of Bram Stoker's classic vampire story Count Dracula in the 1927 Broadway production and subsequent 1931 theatrical version.	JPL · 125071
125076 Michelmayor	2001 UD_{6}	Michel Mayor (born 1942) is a Swiss astrophysicist at Geneva University.	JPL · 125076

== 125101–125200 ==
back to top

Named minor planet	Provisional	This minor planet was named for...	Ref · Catalog
There are no named minor planets in this number range

== 125201–125300 ==
back to top

Named minor planet	Provisional	This minor planet was named for...	Ref · Catalog
There are no named minor planets in this number range

== 125301–125400 ==
back to top

Named minor planet	Provisional	This minor planet was named for...	Ref · Catalog
125371 Vojáček	2001 VV_{71}	Vlastimil Vojáček (b. 1984), a Czech astronomer.	IAU · 125371

== 125401–125500 ==
back to top

Named minor planet	Provisional	This minor planet was named for...	Ref · Catalog
125473 Keisaku	2001 WP_{14}	Keisaku Ninomiya (1804–1862), a Japanese medical doctor who studied Western medicine and pharmaceutics under the German doctor Philipp Franz von Siebold in Nagasaki	JPL · 125473
125476 Frangarcia	2001 WE_{16}	Francisco Garcia (born 1959), Spanish amateur astronomer	JPL · 125476

== 125501–125600 ==
back to top

Named minor planet	Provisional	This minor planet was named for...	Ref · Catalog
125592 Buthiers	2001 XO_{33}	Buthiers Observatory (199), where this minor planet was discovered by French astronomer Jean-Claude Merlin	JPL · 125592

== 125601–125700 ==
back to top

Named minor planet	Provisional	This minor planet was named for...	Ref · Catalog
There are no named minor planets in this number range

== 125701–125800 ==
back to top

Named minor planet	Provisional	This minor planet was named for...	Ref · Catalog
125718 Jemasalomon	2001 XH_{105}	Jean-Marc Salomon (1955–1981), French amateur astronomer; the 0.6-m telescope with which this minor planet was discovered is also named in his honour	JPL · 125718

== 125801–125900 ==
back to top

Named minor planet	Provisional	This minor planet was named for...	Ref · Catalog
There are no named minor planets in this number range

== 125901–126000 ==
back to top

Named minor planet	Provisional	This minor planet was named for...	Ref · Catalog
There are no named minor planets in this number range

back to top

Preceded by 124,001–125,000	Meanings of minor-planet names List of minor planets: 125,001–126,000	Succeeded by 126,001–127,000
