= Henri M. J. Boffin =

Belgian astronomer

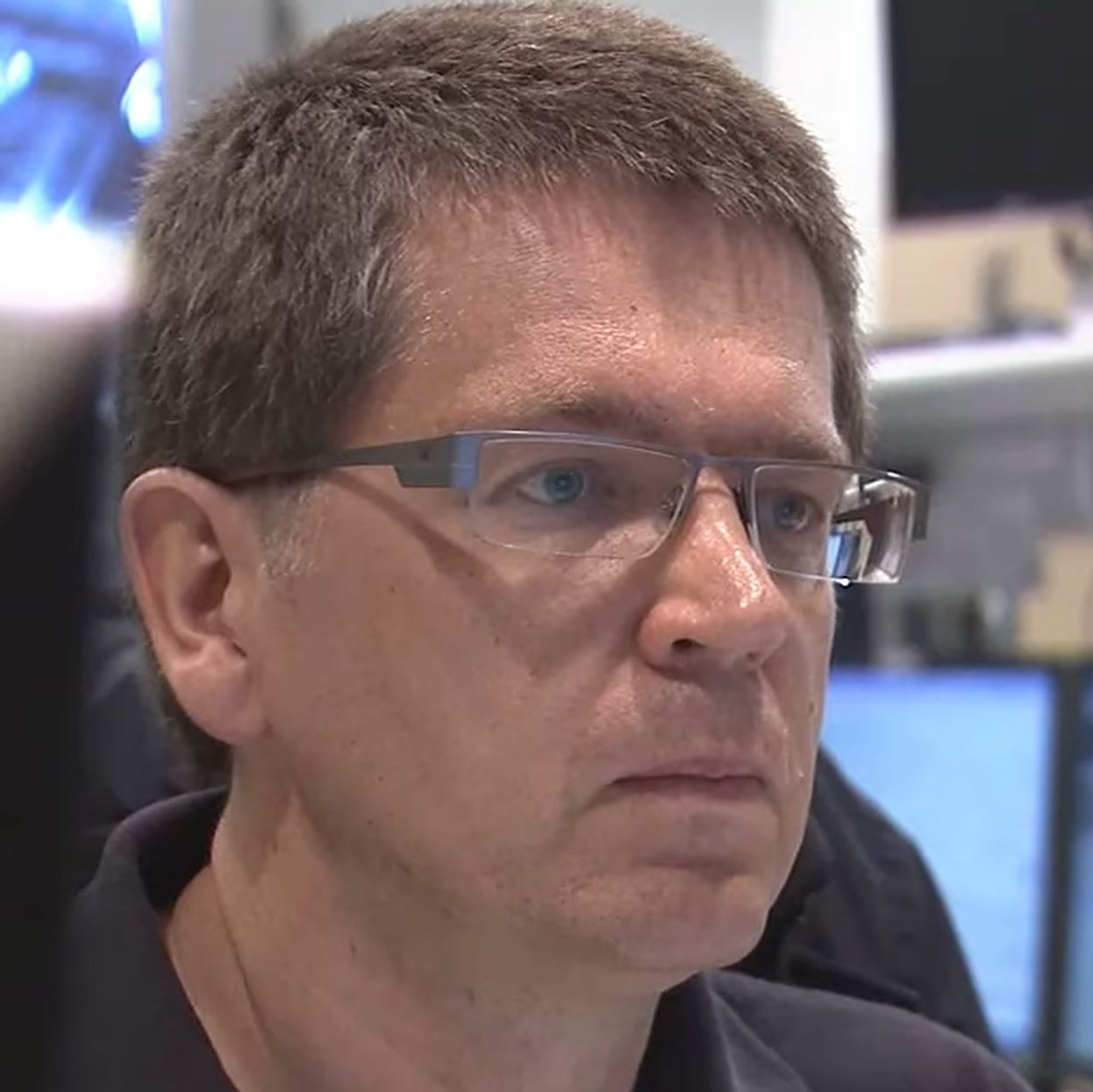

Minor planets discovered: 11
37392 Yukiniall	December 10, 2001
55543 Nemeghaire	December 8, 2001
91604 Clausmadsen	October 14, 1999
94884 Takuya	December 14, 2001
(125547) 2001 XJ_{3}	8 December 2001
(125688) 2001 XT_{88}	13 December 2001
(125719) 2001 XQ_{105}	14 December 2001
(200766) 2001 XY_{4}	8 December 2001
(213424) 2001 XS_{88}	13 December 2001
(258372) 2001 XH_{3}	8 December 2001
(413126) 2001 XU_{88}	14 December 2001

Henri M. J. Boffin is a Belgian astronomer from the European Southern Observatory, credited by the Minor Planet Center with the discovery of 11 numbered minor planets between 1999 and 2001, some in collaboration with Thierry Pauwels.

Henri Boffin received his PhD in 1993 from the Université libre de Bruxelles for his work on the formation of barium stars and has since gone on to work on a variety of problems in the study of binary stars. Most recently, he has dedicated his time to the study of binary stars in planetary nebulae, including discovering the binary central star of Fleming 1, and the use of optical interferometry to study mass-transfer.

He is also extremely active in science communication, having been coordinator of the International Year of Astronomy 2009 Gigagalaxy Zoom project, as well as being interviewed about his work in a wide range of publications.

Boffin named the main-belt asteroid 37392 Yukiniall after his two children, Yuki and Niall. Naming citation was published on 24 July 2002 (M.P.C. 46112).
