= Meanings of minor-planet names: 123001–124000 =

As minor planet discoveries are confirmed, they are given a permanent number by the IAU's Minor Planet Center (MPC), and the discoverers can then submit names for them, following the IAU's naming conventions. The list below concerns those minor planets in the specified number-range that have received names, and explains the meanings of those names.

Official naming citations of newly named small Solar System bodies are approved and published in a bulletin by IAU's Working Group for Small Bodies Nomenclature (WGSBN). Before May 2021, citations were published in MPC's Minor Planet Circulars for many decades. Recent citations can also be found on the JPL Small-Body Database (SBDB). Until his death in 2016, German astronomer Lutz D. Schmadel compiled these citations into the Dictionary of Minor Planet Names (DMP) and regularly updated the collection.

Based on Paul Herget's The Names of the Minor Planets, Schmadel also researched the unclear origin of numerous asteroids, most of which had been named prior to World War II. This article incorporates text from this source, which is in the public domain: SBDB New namings may only be added to this list below after official publication as the preannouncement of names is condemned. The WGSBN publishes a comprehensive guideline for the naming rules of non-cometary small Solar System bodies.

== 123001–123100 ==
Named minor planet	Provisional	This minor planet was named for...	Ref · Catalog
There are no named minor planets in this number range

== 123101–123200 ==
back to top

Named minor planet	Provisional	This minor planet was named for...	Ref · Catalog
123120 Peternewman	2000 SQ_{372}	Peter R. Newman (born 1954), British astronomer with the Sloan Digital Sky Survey	JPL · 123120

== 123201–123300 ==
back to top

Named minor planet	Provisional	This minor planet was named for...	Ref · Catalog
123290 Manoa	2000 UH_{100}	Manoa valley, on the island of Oahu, where the University of Hawaiʻi was founded in 1907 (the provisional designation's subscript stands for the university's centennial celebration of 2007)	JPL · 123290

== 123301–123400 ==
back to top

Named minor planet	Provisional	This minor planet was named for...	Ref · Catalog
There are no named minor planets in this number range

== 123401–123500 ==
back to top

Named minor planet	Provisional	This minor planet was named for...	Ref · Catalog
There are no named minor planets in this number range

== 123501–123600 ==
back to top

Named minor planet	Provisional	This minor planet was named for...	Ref · Catalog
There are no named minor planets in this number range

== 123601–123700 ==
back to top

Named minor planet	Provisional	This minor planet was named for...	Ref · Catalog
123647 Tomáško	2000 YG_{66}	Tomáš Kušnirák (born 2002), the only child of the Slovak discoverers Peter Kušnirák and Ulrika Babiaková	JPL · 123647

== 123701–123800 ==
back to top

Named minor planet	Provisional	This minor planet was named for...	Ref · Catalog
123794 Deadwood	2001 BE_{42}	The rowdy mining camp of Deadwood, South Dakota, was founded in 1876 during the Black Hills Gold Rush, and was home to many colorful western characters including Wild Bill Hickok, Calamity Jane, and Seth Bullock. Name suggested by the Deadwood High School Class of 1961.	IAU · 123794

== 123801–123900 ==
back to top

Named minor planet	Provisional	This minor planet was named for...	Ref · Catalog
123818 Helenzier	2001 BC_{75}	Helen Zier (born 1938), American amateur astronomer, birder and volunteer in several scientific research programs	JPL · 123818
123852 Jánboďa	2001 CM_{37}	Ján Boda (born 1956), Slovak geophysicist and senior lecturer at the Comenius University in Bratislava	JPL · 123852
123860 Davederrick	2001 DX	David Derrick (born 1952), American educator, who built a private planetarium, space museum and observatory	JPL · 123860

== 123901–124000 ==
back to top

Named minor planet	Provisional	This minor planet was named for...	Ref · Catalog
There are no named minor planets in this number range

back to top

Preceded by 122,001–123,000	Meanings of minor-planet names List of minor planets: 123,001–124,000	Succeeded by 124,001–125,000
