= List of minor planets: 123001–124000 =

The following is a partial list of minor planets, running from minor-planet number 123001 through 124000, inclusive. The primary data for this and other partial lists is based on JPL's "Small-Body Orbital Elements" and data available from the Minor Planet Center. Critical list information is also provided by the MPC, unless otherwise specified from Lowell Observatory. A detailed description of the table's columns and additional sources are given on the main page including a complete list of every page in this series, and a statistical break-up on the dynamical classification of minor planets.

Also see the summary list of all named bodies in numerical and alphabetical order, and the corresponding naming citations for the number range of this particular list. New namings may only be added to this list after official publication, as the preannouncement of names is condemned by the Working Group for Small Bodies Nomenclature of the International Astronomical Union.

Near-Earth obj.	MBA (inner)	MBA (outer)	Centaur
Mars-crosser	MBA (middle)	Jupiter trojan	Trans-Neptunian obj.
Unclassified

== 123001–123100 ==
Designation			Discovery			Properties		Ref
Permanent	Provisional	Named after	Date	Site	Discoverer(s)	Category	Diam.	Ref
123001	2000 SV_{253}	—	September 24, 2000	Socorro	LINEAR	·	3.8 km	MPC · JPL
123002	2000 SS_{255}	—	September 24, 2000	Socorro	LINEAR	·	1.8 km	MPC · JPL
123003	2000 SC_{258}	—	September 24, 2000	Socorro	LINEAR	(5)	2.0 km	MPC · JPL
123004	2000 SH_{258}	—	September 24, 2000	Socorro	LINEAR	·	4.1 km	MPC · JPL
123005	2000 SZ_{258}	—	September 24, 2000	Socorro	LINEAR	·	2.1 km	MPC · JPL
123006	2000 SD_{259}	—	September 24, 2000	Socorro	LINEAR	·	2.3 km	MPC · JPL
123007	2000 SD_{260}	—	September 24, 2000	Socorro	LINEAR	·	3.2 km	MPC · JPL
123008	2000 SJ_{260}	—	September 24, 2000	Socorro	LINEAR	·	1.9 km	MPC · JPL
123009	2000 ST_{260}	—	September 24, 2000	Socorro	LINEAR	·	1.8 km	MPC · JPL
123010	2000 SF_{262}	—	September 25, 2000	Socorro	LINEAR	·	2.7 km	MPC · JPL
123011	2000 SL_{262}	—	September 25, 2000	Socorro	LINEAR	·	3.8 km	MPC · JPL
123012	2000 SQ_{262}	—	September 25, 2000	Socorro	LINEAR	EUN	3.2 km	MPC · JPL
123013	2000 SV_{264}	—	September 26, 2000	Socorro	LINEAR	·	1.8 km	MPC · JPL
123014	2000 SB_{265}	—	September 26, 2000	Socorro	LINEAR	·	2.4 km	MPC · JPL
123015	2000 SW_{265}	—	September 26, 2000	Socorro	LINEAR	·	2.9 km	MPC · JPL
123016	2000 SA_{266}	—	September 26, 2000	Socorro	LINEAR	·	4.3 km	MPC · JPL
123017	2000 SD_{266}	—	September 26, 2000	Socorro	LINEAR	·	2.2 km	MPC · JPL
123018	2000 SG_{267}	—	September 27, 2000	Socorro	LINEAR	·	2.4 km	MPC · JPL
123019	2000 SX_{268}	—	September 27, 2000	Socorro	LINEAR	·	3.1 km	MPC · JPL
123020	2000 SV_{270}	—	September 27, 2000	Socorro	LINEAR	MRX	1.9 km	MPC · JPL
123021	2000 SV_{272}	—	September 28, 2000	Socorro	LINEAR	·	2.9 km	MPC · JPL
123022	2000 SX_{272}	—	September 28, 2000	Socorro	LINEAR	·	2.8 km	MPC · JPL
123023	2000 SE_{273}	—	September 28, 2000	Socorro	LINEAR	·	4.4 km	MPC · JPL
123024	2000 SM_{276}	—	September 30, 2000	Socorro	LINEAR	·	3.6 km	MPC · JPL
123025	2000 SB_{279}	—	September 30, 2000	Socorro	LINEAR	·	4.3 km	MPC · JPL
123026	2000 SZ_{279}	—	September 25, 2000	Socorro	LINEAR	EUN	2.3 km	MPC · JPL
123027	2000 SC_{280}	—	September 27, 2000	Socorro	LINEAR	·	3.4 km	MPC · JPL
123028	2000 SD_{282}	—	September 23, 2000	Socorro	LINEAR	NEM	3.5 km	MPC · JPL
123029	2000 SO_{282}	—	September 23, 2000	Socorro	LINEAR	·	2.6 km	MPC · JPL
123030	2000 SH_{283}	—	September 23, 2000	Socorro	LINEAR	·	3.0 km	MPC · JPL
123031	2000 SN_{283}	—	September 23, 2000	Socorro	LINEAR	·	4.1 km	MPC · JPL
123032	2000 SG_{286}	—	September 24, 2000	Socorro	LINEAR	·	2.6 km	MPC · JPL
123033	2000 SJ_{286}	—	September 24, 2000	Socorro	LINEAR	·	2.8 km	MPC · JPL
123034	2000 SG_{288}	—	September 26, 2000	Socorro	LINEAR	·	5.3 km	MPC · JPL
123035	2000 SK_{288}	—	September 27, 2000	Socorro	LINEAR	·	2.5 km	MPC · JPL
123036	2000 SO_{288}	—	September 27, 2000	Socorro	LINEAR	EUN	1.9 km	MPC · JPL
123037	2000 SF_{289}	—	September 27, 2000	Socorro	LINEAR	·	2.0 km	MPC · JPL
123038	2000 SH_{290}	—	September 27, 2000	Socorro	LINEAR	WIT	1.9 km	MPC · JPL
123039	2000 SJ_{290}	—	September 27, 2000	Socorro	LINEAR	·	2.9 km	MPC · JPL
123040	2000 SK_{291}	—	September 27, 2000	Socorro	LINEAR	(5)	1.9 km	MPC · JPL
123041	2000 SP_{291}	—	September 27, 2000	Socorro	LINEAR	·	2.6 km	MPC · JPL
123042	2000 SR_{291}	—	September 27, 2000	Socorro	LINEAR	DOR	4.6 km	MPC · JPL
123043	2000 SV_{291}	—	September 27, 2000	Socorro	LINEAR	·	2.4 km	MPC · JPL
123044	2000 SK_{292}	—	September 27, 2000	Socorro	LINEAR	·	3.4 km	MPC · JPL
123045	2000 SO_{292}	—	September 27, 2000	Socorro	LINEAR	GEF	2.3 km	MPC · JPL
123046	2000 SG_{294}	—	September 27, 2000	Socorro	LINEAR	·	2.6 km	MPC · JPL
123047	2000 ST_{294}	—	September 27, 2000	Socorro	LINEAR	KRM	4.6 km	MPC · JPL
123048	2000 SY_{294}	—	September 27, 2000	Socorro	LINEAR	JUN	1.7 km	MPC · JPL
123049	2000 SA_{295}	—	September 27, 2000	Socorro	LINEAR	EUN	2.8 km	MPC · JPL
123050	2000 SL_{295}	—	September 27, 2000	Socorro	LINEAR	MAR	3.1 km	MPC · JPL
123051	2000 SN_{295}	—	September 27, 2000	Socorro	LINEAR	·	2.5 km	MPC · JPL
123052	2000 SY_{295}	—	September 27, 2000	Socorro	LINEAR	·	4.4 km	MPC · JPL
123053	2000 SV_{297}	—	September 28, 2000	Socorro	LINEAR	·	3.8 km	MPC · JPL
123054	2000 SH_{298}	—	September 28, 2000	Socorro	LINEAR	·	1.7 km	MPC · JPL
123055	2000 SR_{298}	—	September 28, 2000	Socorro	LINEAR	V	1.4 km	MPC · JPL
123056	2000 SO_{300}	—	September 28, 2000	Socorro	LINEAR	·	3.7 km	MPC · JPL
123057	2000 SP_{300}	—	September 28, 2000	Socorro	LINEAR	·	3.4 km	MPC · JPL
123058	2000 SZ_{300}	—	September 28, 2000	Socorro	LINEAR	·	2.7 km	MPC · JPL
123059	2000 SV_{301}	—	September 28, 2000	Socorro	LINEAR	·	2.5 km	MPC · JPL
123060	2000 SZ_{301}	—	September 28, 2000	Socorro	LINEAR	MRX	1.9 km	MPC · JPL
123061	2000 SV_{302}	—	September 28, 2000	Socorro	LINEAR	EUN	2.2 km	MPC · JPL
123062	2000 SY_{302}	—	September 28, 2000	Socorro	LINEAR	·	2.1 km	MPC · JPL
123063	2000 SL_{303}	—	September 28, 2000	Socorro	LINEAR	·	3.8 km	MPC · JPL
123064	2000 SN_{303}	—	September 28, 2000	Socorro	LINEAR	·	2.3 km	MPC · JPL
123065	2000 SY_{303}	—	September 30, 2000	Socorro	LINEAR	·	2.7 km	MPC · JPL
123066	2000 SG_{304}	—	September 30, 2000	Socorro	LINEAR	·	2.1 km	MPC · JPL
123067	2000 SZ_{304}	—	September 30, 2000	Socorro	LINEAR	EUN	1.6 km	MPC · JPL
123068	2000 SJ_{305}	—	September 30, 2000	Socorro	LINEAR	GEF	1.8 km	MPC · JPL
123069	2000 SS_{306}	—	September 30, 2000	Socorro	LINEAR	V	1.6 km	MPC · JPL
123070	2000 SQ_{309}	—	September 24, 2000	Socorro	LINEAR	·	3.4 km	MPC · JPL
123071	2000 ST_{310}	—	September 26, 2000	Socorro	LINEAR	MAR	3.6 km	MPC · JPL
123072	2000 SE_{311}	—	September 26, 2000	Socorro	LINEAR	·	3.7 km	MPC · JPL
123073	2000 SF_{311}	—	September 26, 2000	Socorro	LINEAR	EUN	3.0 km	MPC · JPL
123074	2000 SG_{311}	—	September 26, 2000	Socorro	LINEAR	·	4.6 km	MPC · JPL
123075	2000 SA_{312}	—	September 27, 2000	Socorro	LINEAR	·	2.7 km	MPC · JPL
123076	2000 SK_{312}	—	September 27, 2000	Socorro	LINEAR	·	3.4 km	MPC · JPL
123077	2000 SF_{313}	—	September 27, 2000	Socorro	LINEAR	·	2.5 km	MPC · JPL
123078	2000 SZ_{313}	—	September 27, 2000	Socorro	LINEAR	·	3.3 km	MPC · JPL
123079	2000 SG_{315}	—	September 28, 2000	Socorro	LINEAR	·	2.9 km	MPC · JPL
123080	2000 SA_{316}	—	September 30, 2000	Socorro	LINEAR	·	2.9 km	MPC · JPL
123081	2000 SN_{316}	—	September 30, 2000	Socorro	LINEAR	EUN	2.3 km	MPC · JPL
123082	2000 SD_{319}	—	September 26, 2000	Socorro	LINEAR	·	3.5 km	MPC · JPL
123083	2000 SL_{319}	—	September 26, 2000	Socorro	LINEAR	EUN · slow	2.9 km	MPC · JPL
123084	2000 SV_{319}	—	September 27, 2000	Socorro	LINEAR	·	3.4 km	MPC · JPL
123085	2000 ST_{320}	—	September 30, 2000	Socorro	LINEAR	MRX	2.1 km	MPC · JPL
123086	2000 SH_{321}	—	September 28, 2000	Črni Vrh	Mikuž, H.	·	2.6 km	MPC · JPL
123087	2000 SQ_{327}	—	September 30, 2000	Socorro	LINEAR	·	1.5 km	MPC · JPL
123088	2000 SU_{327}	—	September 30, 2000	Socorro	LINEAR	·	5.6 km	MPC · JPL
123089	2000 SL_{328}	—	September 30, 2000	Kitt Peak	Spacewatch	·	1.9 km	MPC · JPL
123090	2000 SQ_{328}	—	September 30, 2000	Kitt Peak	Spacewatch	MAR	1.8 km	MPC · JPL
123091	2000 SE_{329}	—	September 27, 2000	Kitt Peak	Spacewatch	MAS	1.5 km	MPC · JPL
123092	2000 SZ_{333}	—	September 26, 2000	Haleakala	NEAT	·	4.3 km	MPC · JPL
123093	2000 SD_{335}	—	September 26, 2000	Haleakala	NEAT	·	3.2 km	MPC · JPL
123094	2000 SL_{336}	—	September 26, 2000	Haleakala	NEAT	·	2.2 km	MPC · JPL
123095	2000 SV_{336}	—	September 26, 2000	Haleakala	NEAT	·	1.6 km	MPC · JPL
123096	2000 SJ_{338}	—	September 25, 2000	Kitt Peak	Spacewatch	·	2.0 km	MPC · JPL
123097	2000 SE_{340}	—	September 24, 2000	Socorro	LINEAR	PHO	2.4 km	MPC · JPL
123098	2000 SJ_{340}	—	September 24, 2000	Socorro	LINEAR	·	2.6 km	MPC · JPL
123099	2000 SF_{342}	—	September 24, 2000	Socorro	LINEAR	·	3.2 km	MPC · JPL
123100	2000 SC_{343}	—	September 24, 2000	Socorro	LINEAR	·	3.7 km	MPC · JPL

== 123101–123200 ==
back to top

Designation			Discovery			Properties		Ref
Permanent	Provisional	Named after	Date	Site	Discoverer(s)	Category	Diam.	Ref
123101	2000 SQ_{344}	—	September 29, 2000	Xinglong	SCAP	·	5.1 km	MPC · JPL
123102	2000 SU_{344}	—	September 20, 2000	Socorro	LINEAR	·	2.4 km	MPC · JPL
123103	2000 SJ_{347}	—	September 25, 2000	Socorro	LINEAR	·	3.0 km	MPC · JPL
123104	2000 SV_{348}	—	September 30, 2000	Anderson Mesa	LONEOS	slow	3.9 km	MPC · JPL
123105	2000 SS_{349}	—	September 29, 2000	Anderson Mesa	LONEOS	·	2.3 km	MPC · JPL
123106	2000 SX_{349}	—	September 29, 2000	Anderson Mesa	LONEOS	·	2.9 km	MPC · JPL
123107	2000 SF_{350}	—	September 29, 2000	Anderson Mesa	LONEOS	·	2.8 km	MPC · JPL
123108	2000 SM_{351}	—	September 29, 2000	Anderson Mesa	LONEOS	·	2.8 km	MPC · JPL
123109	2000 SQ_{355}	—	September 29, 2000	Anderson Mesa	LONEOS	·	2.2 km	MPC · JPL
123110	2000 SL_{357}	—	September 28, 2000	Anderson Mesa	LONEOS	·	3.4 km	MPC · JPL
123111	2000 SV_{357}	—	September 28, 2000	Anderson Mesa	LONEOS	BRA	2.4 km	MPC · JPL
123112	2000 SW_{357}	—	September 28, 2000	Anderson Mesa	LONEOS	·	3.3 km	MPC · JPL
123113	2000 SH_{361}	—	September 23, 2000	Anderson Mesa	LONEOS	·	2.0 km	MPC · JPL
123114	2000 SO_{365}	—	September 21, 2000	Anderson Mesa	LONEOS	·	1.9 km	MPC · JPL
123115	2000 SE_{366}	—	September 23, 2000	Socorro	LINEAR	·	2.3 km	MPC · JPL
123116	2000 SC_{367}	—	September 23, 2000	Anderson Mesa	LONEOS	V	1.2 km	MPC · JPL
123117	2000 SD_{367}	—	September 23, 2000	Anderson Mesa	LONEOS	·	2.6 km	MPC · JPL
123118	2000 SH_{369}	—	September 22, 2000	Anderson Mesa	LONEOS	·	3.4 km	MPC · JPL
123119	2000 SA_{370}	—	September 24, 2000	Anderson Mesa	LONEOS	·	2.5 km	MPC · JPL
123120 Peternewman	2000 SQ_{372}	Peternewman	September 26, 2000	Apache Point	SDSS	EOS	3.8 km	MPC · JPL
123121	2000 TA_{3}	—	October 1, 2000	Socorro	LINEAR	·	1.8 km	MPC · JPL
123122	2000 TS_{4}	—	October 1, 2000	Socorro	LINEAR	MRX	1.8 km	MPC · JPL
123123	2000 TD_{5}	—	October 1, 2000	Socorro	LINEAR	·	2.7 km	MPC · JPL
123124	2000 TZ_{5}	—	October 1, 2000	Socorro	LINEAR	NYS	2.2 km	MPC · JPL
123125	2000 TQ_{7}	—	October 1, 2000	Socorro	LINEAR	·	1.7 km	MPC · JPL
123126	2000 TS_{7}	—	October 1, 2000	Socorro	LINEAR	NYS	1.5 km	MPC · JPL
123127	2000 TA_{8}	—	October 1, 2000	Socorro	LINEAR	NYS ·	2.6 km	MPC · JPL
123128	2000 TW_{8}	—	October 1, 2000	Socorro	LINEAR	·	3.2 km	MPC · JPL
123129	2000 TX_{11}	—	October 1, 2000	Socorro	LINEAR	·	3.1 km	MPC · JPL
123130	2000 TY_{11}	—	October 1, 2000	Socorro	LINEAR	PHO	1.9 km	MPC · JPL
123131	2000 TD_{12}	—	October 1, 2000	Socorro	LINEAR	·	1.2 km	MPC · JPL
123132	2000 TK_{12}	—	October 1, 2000	Socorro	LINEAR	EOS	4.1 km	MPC · JPL
123133	2000 TH_{13}	—	October 1, 2000	Socorro	LINEAR	·	3.3 km	MPC · JPL
123134	2000 TL_{13}	—	October 1, 2000	Socorro	LINEAR	AGN	2.1 km	MPC · JPL
123135	2000 TS_{13}	—	October 1, 2000	Socorro	LINEAR	·	3.1 km	MPC · JPL
123136	2000 TA_{16}	—	October 1, 2000	Socorro	LINEAR	·	1.7 km	MPC · JPL
123137	2000 TN_{17}	—	October 1, 2000	Socorro	LINEAR	·	2.5 km	MPC · JPL
123138	2000 TZ_{17}	—	October 1, 2000	Socorro	LINEAR	·	3.0 km	MPC · JPL
123139	2000 TB_{18}	—	October 1, 2000	Socorro	LINEAR	(5)	2.5 km	MPC · JPL
123140	2000 TD_{18}	—	October 1, 2000	Socorro	LINEAR	·	2.2 km	MPC · JPL
123141	2000 TK_{18}	—	October 1, 2000	Socorro	LINEAR	·	3.1 km	MPC · JPL
123142	2000 TN_{18}	—	October 1, 2000	Socorro	LINEAR	·	3.9 km	MPC · JPL
123143	2000 TX_{18}	—	October 1, 2000	Socorro	LINEAR	·	1.7 km	MPC · JPL
123144	2000 TY_{19}	—	October 1, 2000	Socorro	LINEAR	·	2.0 km	MPC · JPL
123145	2000 TU_{21}	—	October 1, 2000	Socorro	LINEAR	MAS	1.0 km	MPC · JPL
123146	2000 TB_{24}	—	October 2, 2000	Socorro	LINEAR	·	2.4 km	MPC · JPL
123147	2000 TL_{25}	—	October 2, 2000	Socorro	LINEAR	JUN	1.7 km	MPC · JPL
123148	2000 TY_{25}	—	October 1, 2000	Socorro	LINEAR	PAD	2.6 km	MPC · JPL
123149	2000 TK_{29}	—	October 3, 2000	Socorro	LINEAR	·	8.9 km	MPC · JPL
123150	2000 TJ_{32}	—	October 6, 2000	Kitt Peak	Spacewatch	·	2.3 km	MPC · JPL
123151	2000 TJ_{33}	—	October 4, 2000	Socorro	LINEAR	·	7.3 km	MPC · JPL
123152	2000 TQ_{37}	—	October 1, 2000	Socorro	LINEAR	·	2.5 km	MPC · JPL
123153	2000 TK_{38}	—	October 1, 2000	Socorro	LINEAR	·	1.5 km	MPC · JPL
123154	2000 TH_{39}	—	October 1, 2000	Socorro	LINEAR	·	2.8 km	MPC · JPL
123155	2000 TL_{40}	—	October 1, 2000	Socorro	LINEAR	·	2.3 km	MPC · JPL
123156	2000 TM_{43}	—	October 1, 2000	Socorro	LINEAR	(5)	2.0 km	MPC · JPL
123157	2000 TG_{45}	—	October 1, 2000	Socorro	LINEAR	·	4.5 km	MPC · JPL
123158	2000 TS_{45}	—	October 1, 2000	Socorro	LINEAR	·	2.4 km	MPC · JPL
123159	2000 TZ_{45}	—	October 1, 2000	Anderson Mesa	LONEOS	·	1.6 km	MPC · JPL
123160	2000 TO_{46}	—	October 1, 2000	Anderson Mesa	LONEOS	NYS	1.4 km	MPC · JPL
123161	2000 TD_{47}	—	October 1, 2000	Anderson Mesa	LONEOS	(5)	1.8 km	MPC · JPL
123162	2000 TV_{47}	—	October 1, 2000	Socorro	LINEAR	·	3.5 km	MPC · JPL
123163	2000 TV_{48}	—	October 1, 2000	Anderson Mesa	LONEOS	·	2.0 km	MPC · JPL
123164	2000 TZ_{50}	—	October 1, 2000	Socorro	LINEAR	·	4.6 km	MPC · JPL
123165	2000 TK_{51}	—	October 1, 2000	Socorro	LINEAR	·	6.2 km	MPC · JPL
123166	2000 TU_{51}	—	October 1, 2000	Socorro	LINEAR	·	2.4 km	MPC · JPL
123167	2000 TY_{53}	—	October 1, 2000	Socorro	LINEAR	·	1.7 km	MPC · JPL
123168	2000 TC_{54}	—	October 1, 2000	Socorro	LINEAR	·	1.4 km	MPC · JPL
123169	2000 TC_{57}	—	October 2, 2000	Anderson Mesa	LONEOS	·	3.9 km	MPC · JPL
123170	2000 TA_{58}	—	October 2, 2000	Anderson Mesa	LONEOS	·	4.4 km	MPC · JPL
123171	2000 TL_{58}	—	October 2, 2000	Anderson Mesa	LONEOS	·	3.7 km	MPC · JPL
123172	2000 TA_{59}	—	October 2, 2000	Anderson Mesa	LONEOS	·	2.7 km	MPC · JPL
123173	2000 TK_{61}	—	October 2, 2000	Anderson Mesa	LONEOS	·	2.6 km	MPC · JPL
123174	2000 TU_{61}	—	October 2, 2000	Anderson Mesa	LONEOS	EUN	2.4 km	MPC · JPL
123175	2000 TD_{63}	—	October 3, 2000	Anderson Mesa	LONEOS	·	3.0 km	MPC · JPL
123176	2000 TO_{63}	—	October 3, 2000	Socorro	LINEAR	·	3.3 km	MPC · JPL
123177	2000 TD_{66}	—	October 1, 2000	Socorro	LINEAR	KOR	1.9 km	MPC · JPL
123178	2000 TU_{66}	—	October 2, 2000	Socorro	LINEAR	·	1.3 km	MPC · JPL
123179	2000 TM_{67}	—	October 2, 2000	Socorro	LINEAR	BRU	4.6 km	MPC · JPL
123180	2000 TP_{68}	—	October 6, 2000	Haleakala	NEAT	·	3.2 km	MPC · JPL
123181	2000 UW_{2}	—	October 22, 2000	Bergisch Gladbach	W. Bickel	·	3.0 km	MPC · JPL
123182	2000 UY_{3}	—	October 24, 2000	Socorro	LINEAR	NYS	1.9 km	MPC · JPL
123183	2000 UQ_{4}	—	October 24, 2000	Socorro	LINEAR	·	2.9 km	MPC · JPL
123184	2000 UQ_{6}	—	October 24, 2000	Socorro	LINEAR	LEO · slow	5.0 km	MPC · JPL
123185	2000 UJ_{7}	—	October 24, 2000	Socorro	LINEAR	·	4.6 km	MPC · JPL
123186	2000 UB_{9}	—	October 24, 2000	Socorro	LINEAR	·	3.4 km	MPC · JPL
123187	2000 UV_{10}	—	October 25, 2000	Socorro	LINEAR	·	2.4 km	MPC · JPL
123188	2000 UW_{10}	—	October 25, 2000	Socorro	LINEAR	·	1.7 km	MPC · JPL
123189	2000 UP_{13}	—	October 23, 2000	Ondřejov	P. Kušnirák	·	3.5 km	MPC · JPL
123190	2000 UK_{14}	—	October 24, 2000	Socorro	LINEAR	·	2.2 km	MPC · JPL
123191	2000 UT_{14}	—	October 25, 2000	Socorro	LINEAR	(13314)	3.3 km	MPC · JPL
123192	2000 UA_{15}	—	October 25, 2000	Socorro	LINEAR	·	5.8 km	MPC · JPL
123193	2000 UD_{15}	—	October 25, 2000	Socorro	LINEAR	·	2.6 km	MPC · JPL
123194	2000 UW_{15}	—	October 27, 2000	Kitt Peak	Spacewatch	KOR	2.0 km	MPC · JPL
123195	2000 UU_{18}	—	October 25, 2000	Socorro	LINEAR	ADE	4.7 km	MPC · JPL
123196	2000 UC_{19}	—	October 29, 2000	Socorro	LINEAR	EUN	2.1 km	MPC · JPL
123197	2000 UV_{19}	—	October 24, 2000	Socorro	LINEAR	·	3.1 km	MPC · JPL
123198	2000 UF_{20}	—	October 24, 2000	Socorro	LINEAR	·	2.0 km	MPC · JPL
123199	2000 UQ_{20}	—	October 24, 2000	Socorro	LINEAR	EUN	2.4 km	MPC · JPL
123200	2000 UA_{24}	—	October 24, 2000	Socorro	LINEAR	·	4.4 km	MPC · JPL

== 123201–123300 ==
back to top

Designation			Discovery			Properties		Ref
Permanent	Provisional	Named after	Date	Site	Discoverer(s)	Category	Diam.	Ref
123201	2000 UK_{24}	—	October 24, 2000	Socorro	LINEAR	·	2.2 km	MPC · JPL
123202	2000 UG_{25}	—	October 24, 2000	Socorro	LINEAR	·	1.9 km	MPC · JPL
123203	2000 UV_{27}	—	October 25, 2000	Socorro	LINEAR	·	2.5 km	MPC · JPL
123204	2000 UX_{27}	—	October 25, 2000	Socorro	LINEAR	(5)	2.6 km	MPC · JPL
123205	2000 UZ_{27}	—	October 25, 2000	Socorro	LINEAR	·	3.9 km	MPC · JPL
123206	2000 UA_{28}	—	October 25, 2000	Socorro	LINEAR	·	2.5 km	MPC · JPL
123207	2000 UC_{28}	—	October 25, 2000	Socorro	LINEAR	·	2.4 km	MPC · JPL
123208	2000 UO_{29}	—	October 24, 2000	Socorro	LINEAR	·	5.1 km	MPC · JPL
123209	2000 UW_{32}	—	October 29, 2000	Kitt Peak	Spacewatch	·	2.3 km	MPC · JPL
123210	2000 UW_{34}	—	October 24, 2000	Socorro	LINEAR	NYS	2.3 km	MPC · JPL
123211	2000 UW_{36}	—	October 24, 2000	Socorro	LINEAR	·	4.8 km	MPC · JPL
123212	2000 UY_{36}	—	October 24, 2000	Socorro	LINEAR	·	2.5 km	MPC · JPL
123213	2000 UK_{37}	—	October 24, 2000	Socorro	LINEAR	·	5.3 km	MPC · JPL
123214	2000 UX_{37}	—	October 24, 2000	Socorro	LINEAR	·	4.4 km	MPC · JPL
123215	2000 UG_{38}	—	October 24, 2000	Socorro	LINEAR	EUN	2.7 km	MPC · JPL
123216	2000 UZ_{39}	—	October 24, 2000	Socorro	LINEAR	·	1.6 km	MPC · JPL
123217	2000 UF_{40}	—	October 24, 2000	Socorro	LINEAR	·	4.5 km	MPC · JPL
123218	2000 UN_{40}	—	October 24, 2000	Socorro	LINEAR	·	4.5 km	MPC · JPL
123219	2000 UC_{41}	—	October 24, 2000	Socorro	LINEAR	·	2.9 km	MPC · JPL
123220	2000 UR_{41}	—	October 24, 2000	Socorro	LINEAR	·	3.6 km	MPC · JPL
123221	2000 UQ_{44}	—	October 24, 2000	Socorro	LINEAR	·	2.4 km	MPC · JPL
123222	2000 UX_{46}	—	October 24, 2000	Socorro	LINEAR	EMA	5.8 km	MPC · JPL
123223	2000 UH_{47}	—	October 24, 2000	Socorro	LINEAR	(5)	2.3 km	MPC · JPL
123224	2000 UR_{48}	—	October 24, 2000	Socorro	LINEAR	·	2.3 km	MPC · JPL
123225	2000 UW_{48}	—	October 24, 2000	Socorro	LINEAR	·	2.6 km	MPC · JPL
123226	2000 UD_{49}	—	October 24, 2000	Socorro	LINEAR	NYS	2.9 km	MPC · JPL
123227	2000 UP_{49}	—	October 24, 2000	Socorro	LINEAR	·	2.7 km	MPC · JPL
123228	2000 UE_{50}	—	October 24, 2000	Socorro	LINEAR	·	3.2 km	MPC · JPL
123229	2000 UT_{52}	—	October 24, 2000	Socorro	LINEAR	AGN	3.2 km	MPC · JPL
123230	2000 UL_{53}	—	October 24, 2000	Socorro	LINEAR	·	4.8 km	MPC · JPL
123231	2000 UC_{55}	—	October 24, 2000	Socorro	LINEAR	(5)	2.7 km	MPC · JPL
123232	2000 UQ_{56}	—	October 25, 2000	Socorro	LINEAR	GEF	1.9 km	MPC · JPL
123233	2000 US_{56}	—	October 25, 2000	Socorro	LINEAR	·	2.7 km	MPC · JPL
123234	2000 UO_{57}	—	October 25, 2000	Socorro	LINEAR	·	2.2 km	MPC · JPL
123235	2000 UP_{57}	—	October 25, 2000	Socorro	LINEAR	HOF	4.9 km	MPC · JPL
123236	2000 UX_{57}	—	October 25, 2000	Socorro	LINEAR	(5)	2.6 km	MPC · JPL
123237	2000 UH_{58}	—	October 25, 2000	Socorro	LINEAR	·	2.0 km	MPC · JPL
123238	2000 UN_{58}	—	October 25, 2000	Socorro	LINEAR	·	2.3 km	MPC · JPL
123239	2000 UQ_{58}	—	October 25, 2000	Socorro	LINEAR	MRX	1.8 km	MPC · JPL
123240	2000 UU_{59}	—	October 25, 2000	Socorro	LINEAR	·	2.1 km	MPC · JPL
123241	2000 UL_{60}	—	October 25, 2000	Socorro	LINEAR	(5)	2.1 km	MPC · JPL
123242	2000 US_{61}	—	October 25, 2000	Socorro	LINEAR	·	2.2 km	MPC · JPL
123243	2000 UW_{63}	—	October 25, 2000	Socorro	LINEAR	·	2.1 km	MPC · JPL
123244	2000 UY_{64}	—	October 25, 2000	Socorro	LINEAR	·	3.6 km	MPC · JPL
123245	2000 UC_{65}	—	October 25, 2000	Socorro	LINEAR	·	2.0 km	MPC · JPL
123246	2000 UO_{65}	—	October 25, 2000	Socorro	LINEAR	·	3.4 km	MPC · JPL
123247	2000 UL_{67}	—	October 25, 2000	Socorro	LINEAR	(18466)	4.2 km	MPC · JPL
123248	2000 UT_{67}	—	October 25, 2000	Socorro	LINEAR	·	3.8 km	MPC · JPL
123249	2000 UK_{68}	—	October 25, 2000	Socorro	LINEAR	·	2.2 km	MPC · JPL
123250	2000 UN_{68}	—	October 25, 2000	Socorro	LINEAR	AGN	2.3 km	MPC · JPL
123251	2000 UP_{68}	—	October 25, 2000	Socorro	LINEAR	·	3.0 km	MPC · JPL
123252	2000 UG_{69}	—	October 25, 2000	Socorro	LINEAR	TEL	3.0 km	MPC · JPL
123253	2000 UC_{70}	—	October 25, 2000	Socorro	LINEAR	·	4.0 km	MPC · JPL
123254	2000 UT_{70}	—	October 25, 2000	Socorro	LINEAR	(5)	2.6 km	MPC · JPL
123255	2000 UM_{71}	—	October 25, 2000	Socorro	LINEAR	MAR	2.2 km	MPC · JPL
123256	2000 US_{73}	—	October 26, 2000	Socorro	LINEAR	(12739)	4.2 km	MPC · JPL
123257	2000 UT_{73}	—	October 26, 2000	Socorro	LINEAR	·	2.5 km	MPC · JPL
123258	2000 UO_{74}	—	October 30, 2000	Socorro	LINEAR	AGN	1.8 km	MPC · JPL
123259	2000 UV_{74}	—	October 31, 2000	Socorro	LINEAR	·	3.7 km	MPC · JPL
123260	2000 UR_{76}	—	October 24, 2000	Socorro	LINEAR	MIS	3.6 km	MPC · JPL
123261	2000 UO_{77}	—	October 24, 2000	Socorro	LINEAR	·	2.3 km	MPC · JPL
123262	2000 UJ_{78}	—	October 24, 2000	Socorro	LINEAR	·	3.6 km	MPC · JPL
123263	2000 UO_{78}	—	October 24, 2000	Socorro	LINEAR	·	3.0 km	MPC · JPL
123264	2000 US_{78}	—	October 24, 2000	Socorro	LINEAR	THM	5.8 km	MPC · JPL
123265	2000 UA_{80}	—	October 24, 2000	Socorro	LINEAR	EUN	3.3 km	MPC · JPL
123266	2000 UY_{81}	—	October 25, 2000	Socorro	LINEAR	HOF	3.8 km	MPC · JPL
123267	2000 UK_{82}	—	October 26, 2000	Socorro	LINEAR	·	3.3 km	MPC · JPL
123268	2000 UQ_{82}	—	October 29, 2000	Socorro	LINEAR	·	2.6 km	MPC · JPL
123269	2000 UT_{84}	—	October 31, 2000	Socorro	LINEAR	·	2.1 km	MPC · JPL
123270	2000 UB_{85}	—	October 31, 2000	Socorro	LINEAR	·	3.1 km	MPC · JPL
123271	2000 UA_{88}	—	October 31, 2000	Socorro	LINEAR	·	2.6 km	MPC · JPL
123272	2000 UN_{89}	—	October 31, 2000	Socorro	LINEAR	·	2.7 km	MPC · JPL
123273	2000 UO_{90}	—	October 24, 2000	Socorro	LINEAR	MAR	1.9 km	MPC · JPL
123274	2000 UZ_{90}	—	October 25, 2000	Socorro	LINEAR	·	3.0 km	MPC · JPL
123275	2000 UO_{91}	—	October 25, 2000	Socorro	LINEAR	·	2.5 km	MPC · JPL
123276	2000 UO_{93}	—	October 25, 2000	Socorro	LINEAR	·	4.9 km	MPC · JPL
123277	2000 UU_{93}	—	October 25, 2000	Socorro	LINEAR	·	4.4 km	MPC · JPL
123278	2000 UG_{95}	—	October 25, 2000	Socorro	LINEAR	·	2.2 km	MPC · JPL
123279	2000 UP_{96}	—	October 25, 2000	Socorro	LINEAR	·	1.7 km	MPC · JPL
123280	2000 UT_{96}	—	October 25, 2000	Socorro	LINEAR	·	2.1 km	MPC · JPL
123281	2000 UY_{96}	—	October 25, 2000	Socorro	LINEAR	·	3.9 km	MPC · JPL
123282	2000 US_{97}	—	October 25, 2000	Socorro	LINEAR	GEF	2.3 km	MPC · JPL
123283	2000 UH_{98}	—	October 25, 2000	Socorro	LINEAR	·	3.7 km	MPC · JPL
123284	2000 UZ_{98}	—	October 25, 2000	Socorro	LINEAR	·	3.2 km	MPC · JPL
123285	2000 UE_{99}	—	October 25, 2000	Socorro	LINEAR	·	2.8 km	MPC · JPL
123286	2000 UG_{99}	—	October 25, 2000	Socorro	LINEAR	·	2.0 km	MPC · JPL
123287	2000 UK_{99}	—	October 25, 2000	Socorro	LINEAR	·	2.9 km	MPC · JPL
123288	2000 UV_{99}	—	October 25, 2000	Socorro	LINEAR	·	3.5 km	MPC · JPL
123289	2000 UC_{100}	—	October 25, 2000	Socorro	LINEAR	(5)	2.2 km	MPC · JPL
123290 Manoa	2000 UH_{100}	Manoa	October 25, 2000	Socorro	LINEAR	·	3.7 km	MPC · JPL
123291	2000 UH_{101}	—	October 25, 2000	Socorro	LINEAR	·	4.3 km	MPC · JPL
123292	2000 UT_{101}	—	October 25, 2000	Socorro	LINEAR	·	3.5 km	MPC · JPL
123293	2000 UU_{102}	—	October 25, 2000	Socorro	LINEAR	JUN	2.4 km	MPC · JPL
123294	2000 UX_{102}	—	October 25, 2000	Socorro	LINEAR	AGN	2.0 km	MPC · JPL
123295	2000 UH_{103}	—	October 25, 2000	Socorro	LINEAR	MAR	3.1 km	MPC · JPL
123296	2000 UJ_{104}	—	October 25, 2000	Socorro	LINEAR	·	3.8 km	MPC · JPL
123297	2000 UC_{105}	—	October 29, 2000	Socorro	LINEAR	·	2.7 km	MPC · JPL
123298	2000 UB_{110}	—	October 31, 2000	Socorro	LINEAR	·	2.7 km	MPC · JPL
123299	2000 UG_{111}	—	October 26, 2000	Kitt Peak	Spacewatch	·	2.5 km	MPC · JPL
123300	2000 UF_{112}	—	October 31, 2000	Socorro	LINEAR	KOR	2.3 km	MPC · JPL

== 123301–123400 ==
back to top

Designation			Discovery			Properties		Ref
Permanent	Provisional	Named after	Date	Site	Discoverer(s)	Category	Diam.	Ref
123301	2000 UK_{112}	—	October 25, 2000	Socorro	LINEAR	·	2.4 km	MPC · JPL
123302	2000 UW_{112}	—	October 19, 2000	McGraw-Hill	G. J. Garradd	·	4.1 km	MPC · JPL
123303	2000 VT	—	November 1, 2000	Kitt Peak	Spacewatch	·	2.7 km	MPC · JPL
123304	2000 VO_{1}	—	November 1, 2000	Socorro	LINEAR	H	1.2 km	MPC · JPL
123305	2000 VZ_{1}	—	November 1, 2000	Socorro	LINEAR	H	860 m	MPC · JPL
123306	2000 VC_{3}	—	November 2, 2000	Kitt Peak	Spacewatch	·	1.3 km	MPC · JPL
123307	2000 VZ_{4}	—	November 1, 2000	Socorro	LINEAR	·	3.1 km	MPC · JPL
123308	2000 VT_{6}	—	November 1, 2000	Socorro	LINEAR	·	1.7 km	MPC · JPL
123309	2000 VV_{6}	—	November 1, 2000	Socorro	LINEAR	·	4.5 km	MPC · JPL
123310	2000 VF_{7}	—	November 1, 2000	Socorro	LINEAR	·	4.5 km	MPC · JPL
123311	2000 VV_{7}	—	November 1, 2000	Socorro	LINEAR	·	4.5 km	MPC · JPL
123312	2000 VY_{7}	—	November 1, 2000	Socorro	LINEAR	·	2.6 km	MPC · JPL
123313	2000 VZ_{7}	—	November 1, 2000	Socorro	LINEAR	slow	4.8 km	MPC · JPL
123314	2000 VC_{8}	—	November 1, 2000	Socorro	LINEAR	·	3.0 km	MPC · JPL
123315	2000 VT_{8}	—	November 1, 2000	Socorro	LINEAR	·	2.4 km	MPC · JPL
123316	2000 VR_{9}	—	November 1, 2000	Socorro	LINEAR	(11882)	3.5 km	MPC · JPL
123317	2000 VU_{9}	—	November 1, 2000	Socorro	LINEAR	MRX	2.1 km	MPC · JPL
123318	2000 VC_{10}	—	November 1, 2000	Socorro	LINEAR	·	3.6 km	MPC · JPL
123319	2000 VN_{10}	—	November 1, 2000	Socorro	LINEAR	·	2.3 km	MPC · JPL
123320	2000 VV_{15}	—	November 1, 2000	Socorro	LINEAR	·	2.8 km	MPC · JPL
123321	2000 VF_{17}	—	November 1, 2000	Socorro	LINEAR	·	2.4 km	MPC · JPL
123322	2000 VS_{19}	—	November 1, 2000	Socorro	LINEAR	·	3.0 km	MPC · JPL
123323	2000 VU_{19}	—	November 1, 2000	Socorro	LINEAR	EUN	1.9 km	MPC · JPL
123324	2000 VA_{20}	—	November 1, 2000	Socorro	LINEAR	·	3.1 km	MPC · JPL
123325	2000 VV_{20}	—	November 1, 2000	Socorro	LINEAR	·	2.1 km	MPC · JPL
123326	2000 VE_{22}	—	November 1, 2000	Socorro	LINEAR	·	4.5 km	MPC · JPL
123327	2000 VT_{23}	—	November 1, 2000	Socorro	LINEAR	MAR	2.9 km	MPC · JPL
123328	2000 VL_{30}	—	November 1, 2000	Socorro	LINEAR	·	2.3 km	MPC · JPL
123329	2000 VC_{31}	—	November 1, 2000	Socorro	LINEAR	ADE	4.3 km	MPC · JPL
123330	2000 VA_{38}	—	November 1, 2000	Socorro	LINEAR	·	4.4 km	MPC · JPL
123331	2000 VC_{40}	—	November 1, 2000	Socorro	LINEAR	·	3.4 km	MPC · JPL
123332	2000 VQ_{41}	—	November 1, 2000	Socorro	LINEAR	·	3.7 km	MPC · JPL
123333	2000 VF_{42}	—	November 1, 2000	Socorro	LINEAR	·	2.1 km	MPC · JPL
123334	2000 VY_{42}	—	November 1, 2000	Socorro	LINEAR	·	3.1 km	MPC · JPL
123335	2000 VQ_{43}	—	November 1, 2000	Socorro	LINEAR	·	3.2 km	MPC · JPL
123336	2000 VD_{45}	—	November 1, 2000	Socorro	LINEAR	·	2.3 km	MPC · JPL
123337	2000 VE_{46}	—	November 3, 2000	Socorro	LINEAR	·	2.4 km	MPC · JPL
123338	2000 VT_{47}	—	November 1, 2000	Socorro	LINEAR	·	3.0 km	MPC · JPL
123339	2000 VY_{52}	—	November 3, 2000	Socorro	LINEAR	·	2.5 km	MPC · JPL
123340	2000 VW_{53}	—	November 3, 2000	Socorro	LINEAR	(5)	2.4 km	MPC · JPL
123341	2000 VQ_{54}	—	November 3, 2000	Socorro	LINEAR	NEM	3.9 km	MPC · JPL
123342	2000 VS_{54}	—	November 3, 2000	Socorro	LINEAR	·	3.7 km	MPC · JPL
123343	2000 VT_{57}	—	November 3, 2000	Socorro	LINEAR	EMA	9.0 km	MPC · JPL
123344	2000 VA_{58}	—	November 3, 2000	Socorro	LINEAR	·	4.2 km	MPC · JPL
123345	2000 VF_{60}	—	November 1, 2000	Socorro	LINEAR	·	2.2 km	MPC · JPL
123346	2000 VG_{60}	—	November 1, 2000	Socorro	LINEAR	·	1.7 km	MPC · JPL
123347	2000 VV_{60}	—	November 1, 2000	Kitt Peak	Spacewatch	·	3.5 km	MPC · JPL
123348	2000 VY_{60}	—	November 1, 2000	Kitt Peak	Spacewatch	THM	3.7 km	MPC · JPL
123349	2000 VP_{61}	—	November 9, 2000	Socorro	LINEAR	(14916)	3.7 km	MPC · JPL
123350	2000 WQ_{1}	—	November 17, 2000	Socorro	LINEAR	·	3.0 km	MPC · JPL
123351	2000 WF_{2}	—	November 18, 2000	Fountain Hills	C. W. Juels	·	3.8 km	MPC · JPL
123352	2000 WU_{3}	—	November 19, 2000	Socorro	LINEAR	EUN	2.2 km	MPC · JPL
123353	2000 WV_{4}	—	November 19, 2000	Socorro	LINEAR	·	3.9 km	MPC · JPL
123354	2000 WT_{6}	—	November 19, 2000	Socorro	LINEAR	·	5.4 km	MPC · JPL
123355	2000 WC_{9}	—	November 18, 2000	Bisei SG Center	BATTeRS	·	2.2 km	MPC · JPL
123356	2000 WX_{15}	—	November 21, 2000	Socorro	LINEAR	·	2.8 km	MPC · JPL
123357	2000 WE_{18}	—	November 21, 2000	Socorro	LINEAR	·	6.0 km	MPC · JPL
123358	2000 WO_{19}	—	November 24, 2000	Moriyama	Moriyama	·	3.8 km	MPC · JPL
123359	2000 WV_{23}	—	November 20, 2000	Socorro	LINEAR	(32418)	3.5 km	MPC · JPL
123360	2000 WN_{26}	—	November 25, 2000	Socorro	LINEAR	EUN	1.9 km	MPC · JPL
123361	2000 WK_{28}	—	November 23, 2000	Haleakala	NEAT	JUN	5.1 km	MPC · JPL
123362	2000 WM_{28}	—	November 23, 2000	Haleakala	NEAT	·	4.0 km	MPC · JPL
123363	2000 WO_{30}	—	November 20, 2000	Socorro	LINEAR	·	2.3 km	MPC · JPL
123364	2000 WN_{31}	—	November 20, 2000	Socorro	LINEAR	EOS	4.1 km	MPC · JPL
123365	2000 WU_{31}	—	November 20, 2000	Socorro	LINEAR	·	2.9 km	MPC · JPL
123366	2000 WE_{32}	—	November 20, 2000	Socorro	LINEAR	EUN	2.9 km	MPC · JPL
123367	2000 WK_{32}	—	November 20, 2000	Socorro	LINEAR	·	4.5 km	MPC · JPL
123368	2000 WX_{32}	—	November 20, 2000	Socorro	LINEAR	·	6.5 km	MPC · JPL
123369	2000 WV_{35}	—	November 20, 2000	Socorro	LINEAR	·	2.7 km	MPC · JPL
123370	2000 WZ_{35}	—	November 20, 2000	Socorro	LINEAR	MRX	1.9 km	MPC · JPL
123371	2000 WD_{36}	—	November 20, 2000	Socorro	LINEAR	MAR ·	5.7 km	MPC · JPL
123372	2000 WA_{37}	—	November 20, 2000	Socorro	LINEAR	·	4.5 km	MPC · JPL
123373	2000 WW_{39}	—	November 20, 2000	Socorro	LINEAR	·	2.2 km	MPC · JPL
123374	2000 WE_{44}	—	November 21, 2000	Socorro	LINEAR	·	2.7 km	MPC · JPL
123375	2000 WU_{44}	—	November 21, 2000	Socorro	LINEAR	KOR	2.5 km	MPC · JPL
123376	2000 WV_{44}	—	November 21, 2000	Socorro	LINEAR	·	4.4 km	MPC · JPL
123377	2000 WA_{45}	—	November 21, 2000	Socorro	LINEAR	·	2.3 km	MPC · JPL
123378	2000 WU_{51}	—	November 27, 2000	Kitt Peak	Spacewatch	·	2.1 km	MPC · JPL
123379	2000 WJ_{53}	—	November 27, 2000	Kitt Peak	Spacewatch	·	2.9 km	MPC · JPL
123380	2000 WW_{53}	—	November 27, 2000	Kitt Peak	Spacewatch	NYS	2.3 km	MPC · JPL
123381	2000 WK_{57}	—	November 21, 2000	Socorro	LINEAR	·	3.3 km	MPC · JPL
123382	2000 WR_{58}	—	November 21, 2000	Socorro	LINEAR	·	3.2 km	MPC · JPL
123383	2000 WW_{58}	—	November 21, 2000	Socorro	LINEAR	·	4.4 km	MPC · JPL
123384	2000 WG_{60}	—	November 21, 2000	Socorro	LINEAR	·	2.5 km	MPC · JPL
123385	2000 WO_{62}	—	November 28, 2000	Višnjan Observatory	K. Korlević	H	1.1 km	MPC · JPL
123386	2000 WW_{62}	—	November 28, 2000	Fountain Hills	C. W. Juels	·	6.9 km	MPC · JPL
123387	2000 WO_{66}	—	November 20, 2000	Socorro	LINEAR	·	4.7 km	MPC · JPL
123388	2000 WR_{69}	—	November 19, 2000	Socorro	LINEAR	·	4.0 km	MPC · JPL
123389	2000 WG_{71}	—	November 19, 2000	Socorro	LINEAR	·	4.8 km	MPC · JPL
123390	2000 WT_{71}	—	November 19, 2000	Socorro	LINEAR	·	1.9 km	MPC · JPL
123391	2000 WX_{71}	—	November 19, 2000	Socorro	LINEAR	·	2.3 km	MPC · JPL
123392	2000 WF_{72}	—	November 19, 2000	Socorro	LINEAR	·	3.1 km	MPC · JPL
123393	2000 WH_{72}	—	November 19, 2000	Socorro	LINEAR	·	4.7 km	MPC · JPL
123394	2000 WU_{73}	—	November 20, 2000	Socorro	LINEAR	·	2.3 km	MPC · JPL
123395	2000 WA_{75}	—	November 20, 2000	Socorro	LINEAR	·	2.7 km	MPC · JPL
123396	2000 WF_{75}	—	November 20, 2000	Socorro	LINEAR	·	4.9 km	MPC · JPL
123397	2000 WB_{78}	—	November 20, 2000	Socorro	LINEAR	(5)	2.5 km	MPC · JPL
123398	2000 WL_{79}	—	November 20, 2000	Socorro	LINEAR	·	2.6 km	MPC · JPL
123399	2000 WP_{80}	—	November 20, 2000	Socorro	LINEAR	(5)	2.4 km	MPC · JPL
123400	2000 WY_{80}	—	November 20, 2000	Socorro	LINEAR	·	3.8 km	MPC · JPL

== 123401–123500 ==
back to top

Designation			Discovery			Properties		Ref
Permanent	Provisional	Named after	Date	Site	Discoverer(s)	Category	Diam.	Ref
123401	2000 WM_{83}	—	November 20, 2000	Socorro	LINEAR	·	2.7 km	MPC · JPL
123402	2000 WS_{83}	—	November 20, 2000	Socorro	LINEAR	WIT	2.0 km	MPC · JPL
123403	2000 WH_{86}	—	November 20, 2000	Socorro	LINEAR	(11882)	3.3 km	MPC · JPL
123404	2000 WS_{88}	—	November 20, 2000	Socorro	LINEAR	·	2.7 km	MPC · JPL
123405	2000 WD_{90}	—	November 21, 2000	Socorro	LINEAR	·	3.9 km	MPC · JPL
123406	2000 WJ_{90}	—	November 21, 2000	Socorro	LINEAR	·	2.6 km	MPC · JPL
123407	2000 WG_{94}	—	November 21, 2000	Socorro	LINEAR	·	3.7 km	MPC · JPL
123408	2000 WZ_{94}	—	November 21, 2000	Socorro	LINEAR	·	4.4 km	MPC · JPL
123409	2000 WJ_{95}	—	November 21, 2000	Socorro	LINEAR	EOS	4.9 km	MPC · JPL
123410	2000 WV_{96}	—	November 21, 2000	Socorro	LINEAR	DOR	6.5 km	MPC · JPL
123411	2000 WM_{97}	—	November 21, 2000	Socorro	LINEAR	·	5.4 km	MPC · JPL
123412	2000 WZ_{97}	—	November 21, 2000	Socorro	LINEAR	·	2.4 km	MPC · JPL
123413	2000 WT_{98}	—	November 21, 2000	Socorro	LINEAR	·	2.6 km	MPC · JPL
123414	2000 WM_{99}	—	November 21, 2000	Socorro	LINEAR	·	4.2 km	MPC · JPL
123415	2000 WN_{99}	—	November 21, 2000	Socorro	LINEAR	NEM	4.2 km	MPC · JPL
123416	2000 WF_{100}	—	November 21, 2000	Socorro	LINEAR	·	2.6 km	MPC · JPL
123417	2000 WN_{103}	—	November 26, 2000	Socorro	LINEAR	·	2.4 km	MPC · JPL
123418	2000 WT_{103}	—	November 27, 2000	Socorro	LINEAR	·	2.4 km	MPC · JPL
123419	2000 WX_{103}	—	November 27, 2000	Socorro	LINEAR	·	3.7 km	MPC · JPL
123420	2000 WN_{105}	—	November 28, 2000	Kitt Peak	Spacewatch	·	2.2 km	MPC · JPL
123421	2000 WV_{105}	—	November 29, 2000	Kitt Peak	Spacewatch	DOR	4.4 km	MPC · JPL
123422	2000 WF_{106}	—	November 29, 2000	Kitt Peak	Spacewatch	·	2.1 km	MPC · JPL
123423	2000 WV_{107}	—	November 20, 2000	Socorro	LINEAR	·	3.9 km	MPC · JPL
123424	2000 WQ_{108}	—	November 20, 2000	Socorro	LINEAR	·	1.9 km	MPC · JPL
123425	2000 WM_{110}	—	November 20, 2000	Socorro	LINEAR	·	2.4 km	MPC · JPL
123426	2000 WE_{111}	—	November 20, 2000	Socorro	LINEAR	(5)	2.3 km	MPC · JPL
123427	2000 WX_{111}	—	November 20, 2000	Socorro	LINEAR	·	4.3 km	MPC · JPL
123428	2000 WJ_{112}	—	November 20, 2000	Socorro	LINEAR	·	2.3 km	MPC · JPL
123429	2000 WB_{115}	—	November 20, 2000	Socorro	LINEAR	·	2.2 km	MPC · JPL
123430	2000 WX_{115}	—	November 20, 2000	Socorro	LINEAR	MRX	2.6 km	MPC · JPL
123431	2000 WG_{117}	—	November 20, 2000	Socorro	LINEAR	·	3.0 km	MPC · JPL
123432	2000 WQ_{118}	—	November 20, 2000	Socorro	LINEAR	EOS	4.5 km	MPC · JPL
123433	2000 WY_{118}	—	November 20, 2000	Socorro	LINEAR	·	2.7 km	MPC · JPL
123434	2000 WD_{119}	—	November 20, 2000	Socorro	LINEAR	EUN	2.8 km	MPC · JPL
123435	2000 WJ_{119}	—	November 20, 2000	Socorro	LINEAR	·	3.9 km	MPC · JPL
123436	2000 WF_{120}	—	November 20, 2000	Socorro	LINEAR	·	3.9 km	MPC · JPL
123437	2000 WP_{121}	—	November 26, 2000	Socorro	LINEAR	WAT	4.3 km	MPC · JPL
123438	2000 WU_{121}	—	November 29, 2000	Socorro	LINEAR	·	3.2 km	MPC · JPL
123439	2000 WS_{125}	—	November 30, 2000	Socorro	LINEAR	·	2.1 km	MPC · JPL
123440	2000 WT_{125}	—	November 30, 2000	Socorro	LINEAR	·	3.0 km	MPC · JPL
123441	2000 WP_{126}	—	November 16, 2000	Kitt Peak	Spacewatch	·	2.2 km	MPC · JPL
123442	2000 WU_{129}	—	November 19, 2000	Kitt Peak	Spacewatch	·	2.1 km	MPC · JPL
123443	2000 WZ_{129}	—	November 19, 2000	Socorro	LINEAR	·	4.6 km	MPC · JPL
123444	2000 WF_{131}	—	November 20, 2000	Anderson Mesa	LONEOS	·	3.6 km	MPC · JPL
123445	2000 WL_{131}	—	November 20, 2000	Anderson Mesa	LONEOS	·	2.4 km	MPC · JPL
123446	2000 WQ_{131}	—	November 20, 2000	Anderson Mesa	LONEOS	·	3.0 km	MPC · JPL
123447	2000 WZ_{131}	—	November 17, 2000	Kitt Peak	Spacewatch	KOR	2.5 km	MPC · JPL
123448	2000 WR_{132}	—	November 19, 2000	Socorro	LINEAR	·	2.2 km	MPC · JPL
123449	2000 WK_{133}	—	November 19, 2000	Socorro	LINEAR	·	2.9 km	MPC · JPL
123450	2000 WZ_{133}	—	November 19, 2000	Socorro	LINEAR	BRG	4.0 km	MPC · JPL
123451	2000 WF_{134}	—	November 19, 2000	Socorro	LINEAR	·	3.0 km	MPC · JPL
123452	2000 WJ_{134}	—	November 19, 2000	Socorro	LINEAR	EUN	2.3 km	MPC · JPL
123453	2000 WF_{135}	—	November 19, 2000	Socorro	LINEAR	EUN	3.5 km	MPC · JPL
123454	2000 WS_{135}	—	November 20, 2000	Anderson Mesa	LONEOS	EUN	2.2 km	MPC · JPL
123455	2000 WF_{136}	—	November 20, 2000	Socorro	LINEAR	·	2.0 km	MPC · JPL
123456	2000 WO_{137}	—	November 20, 2000	Socorro	LINEAR	·	5.3 km	MPC · JPL
123457	2000 WN_{138}	—	November 21, 2000	Socorro	LINEAR	·	3.3 km	MPC · JPL
123458	2000 WW_{138}	—	November 21, 2000	Socorro	LINEAR	·	4.3 km	MPC · JPL
123459	2000 WQ_{139}	—	November 21, 2000	Socorro	LINEAR	·	2.7 km	MPC · JPL
123460	2000 WQ_{141}	—	November 19, 2000	Socorro	LINEAR	·	7.3 km	MPC · JPL
123461	2000 WT_{142}	—	November 20, 2000	Anderson Mesa	LONEOS	·	2.5 km	MPC · JPL
123462	2000 WY_{142}	—	November 20, 2000	Anderson Mesa	LONEOS	EUN	2.6 km	MPC · JPL
123463	2000 WC_{143}	—	November 20, 2000	Anderson Mesa	LONEOS	·	2.5 km	MPC · JPL
123464	2000 WO_{144}	—	November 21, 2000	Socorro	LINEAR	·	1.8 km	MPC · JPL
123465	2000 WH_{145}	—	November 22, 2000	Haleakala	NEAT	·	3.9 km	MPC · JPL
123466	2000 WZ_{145}	—	November 23, 2000	Haleakala	NEAT	·	4.7 km	MPC · JPL
123467	2000 WZ_{146}	—	November 28, 2000	Haleakala	NEAT	slow	6.1 km	MPC · JPL
123468	2000 WS_{147}	—	November 28, 2000	Kitt Peak	Spacewatch	THM	4.7 km	MPC · JPL
123469	2000 WC_{148}	—	November 28, 2000	Kitt Peak	Spacewatch	URS ·	9.3 km	MPC · JPL
123470	2000 WR_{148}	—	November 28, 2000	Haleakala	NEAT	·	3.2 km	MPC · JPL
123471	2000 WE_{149}	—	November 29, 2000	Haleakala	NEAT	GEF	2.8 km	MPC · JPL
123472	2000 WD_{154}	—	November 30, 2000	Socorro	LINEAR	·	2.1 km	MPC · JPL
123473	2000 WH_{154}	—	November 30, 2000	Socorro	LINEAR	·	2.1 km	MPC · JPL
123474	2000 WO_{154}	—	November 30, 2000	Socorro	LINEAR	·	2.9 km	MPC · JPL
123475	2000 WB_{155}	—	November 30, 2000	Socorro	LINEAR	·	4.0 km	MPC · JPL
123476	2000 WC_{155}	—	November 30, 2000	Socorro	LINEAR	·	5.9 km	MPC · JPL
123477	2000 WR_{161}	—	November 20, 2000	Anderson Mesa	LONEOS	·	2.9 km	MPC · JPL
123478	2000 WU_{161}	—	November 20, 2000	Anderson Mesa	LONEOS	·	8.2 km	MPC · JPL
123479	2000 WD_{162}	—	November 20, 2000	Anderson Mesa	LONEOS	·	5.2 km	MPC · JPL
123480	2000 WE_{162}	—	November 20, 2000	Anderson Mesa	LONEOS	slow	4.1 km	MPC · JPL
123481	2000 WV_{162}	—	November 20, 2000	Anderson Mesa	LONEOS	·	2.4 km	MPC · JPL
123482	2000 WL_{163}	—	November 21, 2000	Socorro	LINEAR	·	3.9 km	MPC · JPL
123483	2000 WX_{164}	—	November 22, 2000	Haleakala	NEAT	·	3.4 km	MPC · JPL
123484	2000 WE_{166}	—	November 24, 2000	Anderson Mesa	LONEOS	·	2.1 km	MPC · JPL
123485	2000 WF_{166}	—	November 24, 2000	Anderson Mesa	LONEOS	·	2.5 km	MPC · JPL
123486	2000 WS_{166}	—	November 24, 2000	Anderson Mesa	LONEOS	·	5.7 km	MPC · JPL
123487	2000 WY_{166}	—	November 24, 2000	Anderson Mesa	LONEOS	·	3.4 km	MPC · JPL
123488	2000 WD_{170}	—	November 24, 2000	Anderson Mesa	LONEOS	·	2.6 km	MPC · JPL
123489	2000 WO_{170}	—	November 24, 2000	Anderson Mesa	LONEOS	·	2.4 km	MPC · JPL
123490	2000 WS_{170}	—	November 24, 2000	Anderson Mesa	LONEOS	·	3.5 km	MPC · JPL
123491	2000 WV_{170}	—	November 24, 2000	Anderson Mesa	LONEOS	·	4.7 km	MPC · JPL
123492	2000 WL_{171}	—	November 25, 2000	Socorro	LINEAR	·	4.7 km	MPC · JPL
123493	2000 WU_{171}	—	November 25, 2000	Socorro	LINEAR	·	2.5 km	MPC · JPL
123494	2000 WJ_{173}	—	November 25, 2000	Anderson Mesa	LONEOS	DOR	6.3 km	MPC · JPL
123495	2000 WK_{173}	—	November 25, 2000	Anderson Mesa	LONEOS	·	6.4 km	MPC · JPL
123496	2000 WL_{175}	—	November 26, 2000	Socorro	LINEAR	·	7.5 km	MPC · JPL
123497	2000 WP_{175}	—	November 26, 2000	Socorro	LINEAR	·	8.8 km	MPC · JPL
123498	2000 WN_{178}	—	November 29, 2000	Socorro	LINEAR	·	2.1 km	MPC · JPL
123499	2000 WY_{178}	—	November 30, 2000	Gnosca	S. Sposetti	·	4.7 km	MPC · JPL
123500	2000 WY_{179}	—	November 27, 2000	Socorro	LINEAR	·	1.9 km	MPC · JPL

== 123501–123600 ==
back to top

Designation			Discovery			Properties		Ref
Permanent	Provisional	Named after	Date	Site	Discoverer(s)	Category	Diam.	Ref
123501	2000 WM_{180}	—	November 27, 2000	Socorro	LINEAR	·	2.3 km	MPC · JPL
123502	2000 WV_{180}	—	November 29, 2000	Socorro	LINEAR	·	5.5 km	MPC · JPL
123503	2000 WW_{180}	—	November 29, 2000	Socorro	LINEAR	(5)	1.9 km	MPC · JPL
123504	2000 WE_{181}	—	November 29, 2000	Socorro	LINEAR	·	4.2 km	MPC · JPL
123505	2000 WO_{181}	—	November 30, 2000	Anderson Mesa	LONEOS	·	2.1 km	MPC · JPL
123506	2000 WA_{182}	—	November 25, 2000	Socorro	LINEAR	·	5.0 km	MPC · JPL
123507	2000 WP_{182}	—	November 20, 2000	Anderson Mesa	LONEOS	(18466)	4.6 km	MPC · JPL
123508	2000 WU_{182}	—	November 18, 2000	Socorro	LINEAR	EUN	2.4 km	MPC · JPL
123509	2000 WK_{183}	—	November 26, 2000	La Silla	Hainaut, O. R., Delahodde, C. E., A. C. Delsanti	cubewano (cold) · moon	106 km	MPC · JPL
123510	2000 WV_{184}	—	November 29, 2000	Anderson Mesa	LONEOS	·	2.8 km	MPC · JPL
123511	2000 WP_{185}	—	November 29, 2000	Socorro	LINEAR	MRX	2.1 km	MPC · JPL
123512	2000 WU_{187}	—	November 16, 2000	Anderson Mesa	LONEOS	MAR · slow	2.9 km	MPC · JPL
123513	2000 WV_{188}	—	November 18, 2000	Anderson Mesa	LONEOS	(5)	1.8 km	MPC · JPL
123514	2000 WY_{190}	—	November 19, 2000	Anderson Mesa	LONEOS	·	2.0 km	MPC · JPL
123515	2000 WH_{192}	—	November 19, 2000	Anderson Mesa	LONEOS	·	2.7 km	MPC · JPL
123516	2000 XN_{1}	—	December 3, 2000	Kitt Peak	Spacewatch	·	2.5 km	MPC · JPL
123517	2000 XY_{1}	—	December 3, 2000	Kitt Peak	Spacewatch	·	4.2 km	MPC · JPL
123518	2000 XK_{3}	—	December 1, 2000	Socorro	LINEAR	·	3.6 km	MPC · JPL
123519	2000 XM_{3}	—	December 1, 2000	Socorro	LINEAR	·	4.2 km	MPC · JPL
123520	2000 XY_{3}	—	December 1, 2000	Socorro	LINEAR	·	3.5 km	MPC · JPL
123521	2000 XD_{4}	—	December 1, 2000	Socorro	LINEAR	EUN	4.0 km	MPC · JPL
123522	2000 XA_{5}	—	December 1, 2000	Socorro	LINEAR	·	2.3 km	MPC · JPL
123523	2000 XY_{7}	—	December 1, 2000	Socorro	LINEAR	·	4.6 km	MPC · JPL
123524	2000 XW_{9}	—	December 1, 2000	Socorro	LINEAR	·	4.1 km	MPC · JPL
123525	2000 XB_{10}	—	December 1, 2000	Socorro	LINEAR	·	7.3 km	MPC · JPL
123526	2000 XO_{12}	—	December 4, 2000	Socorro	LINEAR	EUN	2.8 km	MPC · JPL
123527	2000 XQ_{12}	—	December 4, 2000	Socorro	LINEAR	·	3.7 km	MPC · JPL
123528	2000 XZ_{12}	—	December 4, 2000	Socorro	LINEAR	·	3.3 km	MPC · JPL
123529	2000 XA_{13}	—	December 4, 2000	Socorro	LINEAR	·	4.1 km	MPC · JPL
123530	2000 XL_{13}	—	December 4, 2000	Socorro	LINEAR	·	6.5 km	MPC · JPL
123531	2000 XT_{13}	—	December 4, 2000	Socorro	LINEAR	H	1.6 km	MPC · JPL
123532	2000 XZ_{13}	—	December 4, 2000	Bohyunsan	Jeon, Y.-B., Lee, B.-C.	·	1.9 km	MPC · JPL
123533	2000 XX_{15}	—	December 1, 2000	Socorro	LINEAR	·	3.2 km	MPC · JPL
123534	2000 XD_{16}	—	December 1, 2000	Socorro	LINEAR	·	3.3 km	MPC · JPL
123535	2000 XF_{16}	—	December 1, 2000	Socorro	LINEAR	EUN	2.9 km	MPC · JPL
123536	2000 XU_{17}	—	December 4, 2000	Socorro	LINEAR	·	4.3 km	MPC · JPL
123537	2000 XE_{18}	—	December 4, 2000	Socorro	LINEAR	·	3.4 km	MPC · JPL
123538	2000 XR_{19}	—	December 4, 2000	Socorro	LINEAR	·	3.5 km	MPC · JPL
123539	2000 XV_{19}	—	December 4, 2000	Socorro	LINEAR	·	7.5 km	MPC · JPL
123540	2000 XN_{20}	—	December 4, 2000	Socorro	LINEAR	·	4.8 km	MPC · JPL
123541	2000 XS_{20}	—	December 4, 2000	Socorro	LINEAR	KON	5.3 km	MPC · JPL
123542	2000 XM_{21}	—	December 4, 2000	Socorro	LINEAR	·	2.9 km	MPC · JPL
123543	2000 XG_{22}	—	December 4, 2000	Socorro	LINEAR	GEF	2.0 km	MPC · JPL
123544	2000 XK_{22}	—	December 4, 2000	Socorro	LINEAR	·	3.0 km	MPC · JPL
123545	2000 XN_{22}	—	December 4, 2000	Socorro	LINEAR	GEF	2.7 km	MPC · JPL
123546	2000 XK_{23}	—	December 4, 2000	Socorro	LINEAR	·	5.9 km	MPC · JPL
123547	2000 XS_{23}	—	December 4, 2000	Socorro	LINEAR	·	5.5 km	MPC · JPL
123548	2000 XT_{24}	—	December 4, 2000	Socorro	LINEAR	·	6.3 km	MPC · JPL
123549	2000 XF_{25}	—	December 4, 2000	Socorro	LINEAR	·	3.8 km	MPC · JPL
123550	2000 XK_{25}	—	December 4, 2000	Socorro	LINEAR	·	5.4 km	MPC · JPL
123551	2000 XU_{26}	—	December 4, 2000	Socorro	LINEAR	·	3.3 km	MPC · JPL
123552	2000 XD_{29}	—	December 4, 2000	Socorro	LINEAR	·	8.1 km	MPC · JPL
123553	2000 XN_{29}	—	December 4, 2000	Socorro	LINEAR	·	3.5 km	MPC · JPL
123554	2000 XL_{30}	—	December 4, 2000	Socorro	LINEAR	DOR	4.5 km	MPC · JPL
123555	2000 XP_{30}	—	December 4, 2000	Socorro	LINEAR	·	3.1 km	MPC · JPL
123556	2000 XW_{30}	—	December 4, 2000	Socorro	LINEAR	·	2.5 km	MPC · JPL
123557	2000 XJ_{32}	—	December 4, 2000	Socorro	LINEAR	DOR	5.1 km	MPC · JPL
123558	2000 XD_{33}	—	December 4, 2000	Socorro	LINEAR	·	11 km	MPC · JPL
123559	2000 XG_{33}	—	December 4, 2000	Socorro	LINEAR	·	2.2 km	MPC · JPL
123560	2000 XT_{33}	—	December 4, 2000	Socorro	LINEAR	ADE	6.0 km	MPC · JPL
123561	2000 XD_{34}	—	December 4, 2000	Socorro	LINEAR	·	4.5 km	MPC · JPL
123562	2000 XU_{34}	—	December 4, 2000	Socorro	LINEAR	·	7.2 km	MPC · JPL
123563	2000 XY_{34}	—	December 4, 2000	Socorro	LINEAR	·	6.0 km	MPC · JPL
123564	2000 XC_{35}	—	December 4, 2000	Socorro	LINEAR	·	3.9 km	MPC · JPL
123565	2000 XP_{35}	—	December 4, 2000	Socorro	LINEAR	·	2.3 km	MPC · JPL
123566	2000 XR_{35}	—	December 5, 2000	Socorro	LINEAR	·	4.2 km	MPC · JPL
123567	2000 XV_{35}	—	December 5, 2000	Socorro	LINEAR	·	2.7 km	MPC · JPL
123568	2000 XZ_{35}	—	December 5, 2000	Socorro	LINEAR	EUN	3.6 km	MPC · JPL
123569	2000 XC_{36}	—	December 5, 2000	Socorro	LINEAR	EUN	2.5 km	MPC · JPL
123570	2000 XP_{36}	—	December 5, 2000	Socorro	LINEAR	(18466)	2.5 km	MPC · JPL
123571	2000 XV_{36}	—	December 5, 2000	Socorro	LINEAR	·	3.1 km	MPC · JPL
123572	2000 XZ_{36}	—	December 5, 2000	Socorro	LINEAR	EUN	2.0 km	MPC · JPL
123573	2000 XG_{37}	—	December 5, 2000	Socorro	LINEAR	·	3.1 km	MPC · JPL
123574	2000 XJ_{37}	—	December 5, 2000	Socorro	LINEAR	·	3.1 km	MPC · JPL
123575	2000 XA_{38}	—	December 5, 2000	Socorro	LINEAR	·	6.7 km	MPC · JPL
123576	2000 XV_{38}	—	December 4, 2000	Socorro	LINEAR	H	1.0 km	MPC · JPL
123577	2000 XJ_{39}	—	December 4, 2000	Socorro	LINEAR	·	2.8 km	MPC · JPL
123578	2000 XV_{39}	—	December 4, 2000	Socorro	LINEAR	EUN	4.0 km	MPC · JPL
123579	2000 XA_{40}	—	December 5, 2000	Socorro	LINEAR	HNS	3.2 km	MPC · JPL
123580	2000 XK_{40}	—	December 5, 2000	Socorro	LINEAR	MAR	3.0 km	MPC · JPL
123581	2000 XO_{40}	—	December 5, 2000	Socorro	LINEAR	·	2.7 km	MPC · JPL
123582	2000 XQ_{40}	—	December 5, 2000	Socorro	LINEAR	MAR	3.1 km	MPC · JPL
123583	2000 XR_{40}	—	December 5, 2000	Socorro	LINEAR	·	9.7 km	MPC · JPL
123584	2000 XT_{40}	—	December 5, 2000	Socorro	LINEAR	·	3.9 km	MPC · JPL
123585	2000 XD_{41}	—	December 5, 2000	Socorro	LINEAR	EUN	2.9 km	MPC · JPL
123586	2000 XH_{41}	—	December 5, 2000	Socorro	LINEAR	EUN	2.8 km	MPC · JPL
123587	2000 XK_{42}	—	December 5, 2000	Socorro	LINEAR	EUN	2.7 km	MPC · JPL
123588	2000 XM_{42}	—	December 5, 2000	Socorro	LINEAR	·	2.7 km	MPC · JPL
123589	2000 XE_{44}	—	December 6, 2000	Socorro	LINEAR	·	2.4 km	MPC · JPL
123590	2000 XT_{45}	—	December 15, 2000	Socorro	LINEAR	·	8.2 km	MPC · JPL
123591	2000 XV_{45}	—	December 15, 2000	Socorro	LINEAR	PHO	3.3 km	MPC · JPL
123592	2000 XP_{46}	—	December 7, 2000	Socorro	LINEAR	EUN	2.7 km	MPC · JPL
123593	2000 XZ_{46}	—	December 15, 2000	Socorro	LINEAR	·	2.4 km	MPC · JPL
123594	2000 XF_{49}	—	December 4, 2000	Socorro	LINEAR	·	2.4 km	MPC · JPL
123595	2000 XN_{50}	—	December 5, 2000	Socorro	LINEAR	BRA	2.9 km	MPC · JPL
123596	2000 XX_{51}	—	December 6, 2000	Socorro	LINEAR	·	2.6 km	MPC · JPL
123597	2000 YN_{2}	—	December 19, 2000	Socorro	LINEAR	H	1.2 km	MPC · JPL
123598	2000 YW_{3}	—	December 18, 2000	Kitt Peak	Spacewatch	KON	4.3 km	MPC · JPL
123599	2000 YJ_{5}	—	December 20, 2000	Socorro	LINEAR	H	820 m	MPC · JPL
123600	2000 YL_{5}	—	December 20, 2000	Socorro	LINEAR	H	1.0 km	MPC · JPL

== 123601–123700 ==
back to top

Designation			Discovery			Properties		Ref
Permanent	Provisional	Named after	Date	Site	Discoverer(s)	Category	Diam.	Ref
123601	2000 YT_{5}	—	December 19, 2000	Socorro	LINEAR	·	5.9 km	MPC · JPL
123602	2000 YG_{7}	—	December 20, 2000	Socorro	LINEAR	·	2.3 km	MPC · JPL
123603	2000 YV_{7}	—	December 21, 2000	Socorro	LINEAR	·	8.5 km	MPC · JPL
123604	2000 YY_{9}	—	December 20, 2000	Socorro	LINEAR	(5)	2.3 km	MPC · JPL
123605	2000 YU_{10}	—	December 22, 2000	Socorro	LINEAR	·	5.0 km	MPC · JPL
123606	2000 YF_{11}	—	December 22, 2000	Ondřejov	P. Kušnirák, P. Pravec	ADE	3.8 km	MPC · JPL
123607	2000 YA_{12}	—	December 21, 2000	Bergisch Gladbach	W. Bickel	·	5.1 km	MPC · JPL
123608	2000 YC_{13}	—	December 21, 2000	Kitt Peak	Spacewatch	·	2.1 km	MPC · JPL
123609	2000 YJ_{13}	—	December 21, 2000	Kitt Peak	Spacewatch	·	4.2 km	MPC · JPL
123610	2000 YV_{13}	—	December 22, 2000	Kitt Peak	Spacewatch	·	5.3 km	MPC · JPL
123611	2000 YX_{14}	—	December 16, 2000	Uccle	T. Pauwels	·	2.3 km	MPC · JPL
123612	2000 YL_{16}	—	December 22, 2000	Gnosca	S. Sposetti	HYG	6.3 km	MPC · JPL
123613	2000 YQ_{17}	—	December 24, 2000	Ondřejov	P. Kušnirák, U. Babiaková	·	5.2 km	MPC · JPL
123614	2000 YZ_{17}	—	December 20, 2000	Socorro	LINEAR	JUN	2.2 km	MPC · JPL
123615	2000 YS_{20}	—	December 28, 2000	Kitt Peak	Spacewatch	·	2.6 km	MPC · JPL
123616	2000 YG_{23}	—	December 28, 2000	Kitt Peak	Spacewatch	NYS	1.3 km	MPC · JPL
123617	2000 YQ_{24}	—	December 28, 2000	Kitt Peak	Spacewatch	·	3.9 km	MPC · JPL
123618	2000 YS_{25}	—	December 22, 2000	Socorro	LINEAR	·	5.5 km	MPC · JPL
123619	2000 YA_{26}	—	December 23, 2000	Socorro	LINEAR	DOR	5.0 km	MPC · JPL
123620	2000 YP_{26}	—	December 28, 2000	Socorro	LINEAR	·	5.0 km	MPC · JPL
123621	2000 YK_{27}	—	December 30, 2000	Kitt Peak	Spacewatch	·	6.9 km	MPC · JPL
123622	2000 YF_{28}	—	December 26, 2000	Haleakala	NEAT	EUN	2.7 km	MPC · JPL
123623	2000 YJ_{31}	—	December 30, 2000	Kitt Peak	Spacewatch	·	5.4 km	MPC · JPL
123624	2000 YO_{32}	—	December 30, 2000	Socorro	LINEAR	H	1.0 km	MPC · JPL
123625	2000 YO_{36}	—	December 30, 2000	Socorro	LINEAR	·	3.4 km	MPC · JPL
123626	2000 YY_{40}	—	December 30, 2000	Socorro	LINEAR	·	5.1 km	MPC · JPL
123627	2000 YA_{43}	—	December 30, 2000	Socorro	LINEAR	·	6.3 km	MPC · JPL
123628	2000 YK_{44}	—	December 30, 2000	Socorro	LINEAR	THM	3.6 km	MPC · JPL
123629	2000 YR_{46}	—	December 30, 2000	Socorro	LINEAR	·	3.7 km	MPC · JPL
123630	2000 YU_{46}	—	December 30, 2000	Socorro	LINEAR	·	5.1 km	MPC · JPL
123631	2000 YA_{47}	—	December 30, 2000	Socorro	LINEAR	·	4.3 km	MPC · JPL
123632	2000 YO_{47}	—	December 30, 2000	Socorro	LINEAR	·	2.3 km	MPC · JPL
123633	2000 YT_{47}	—	December 30, 2000	Socorro	LINEAR	·	3.8 km	MPC · JPL
123634	2000 YV_{47}	—	December 30, 2000	Socorro	LINEAR	·	4.2 km	MPC · JPL
123635	2000 YH_{50}	—	December 30, 2000	Socorro	LINEAR	·	3.0 km	MPC · JPL
123636	2000 YO_{52}	—	December 30, 2000	Socorro	LINEAR	·	3.0 km	MPC · JPL
123637	2000 YR_{52}	—	December 30, 2000	Socorro	LINEAR	THM	5.2 km	MPC · JPL
123638	2000 YY_{53}	—	December 30, 2000	Socorro	LINEAR	·	5.0 km	MPC · JPL
123639	2000 YY_{54}	—	December 30, 2000	Socorro	LINEAR	·	2.5 km	MPC · JPL
123640	2000 YO_{56}	—	December 30, 2000	Socorro	LINEAR	URS	5.5 km	MPC · JPL
123641	2000 YJ_{58}	—	December 30, 2000	Socorro	LINEAR	·	3.8 km	MPC · JPL
123642	2000 YR_{58}	—	December 30, 2000	Socorro	LINEAR	·	3.9 km	MPC · JPL
123643	2000 YW_{60}	—	December 30, 2000	Socorro	LINEAR	DOR	4.2 km	MPC · JPL
123644	2000 YR_{61}	—	December 30, 2000	Socorro	LINEAR	EOS	3.7 km	MPC · JPL
123645	2000 YQ_{63}	—	December 30, 2000	Socorro	LINEAR	·	4.8 km	MPC · JPL
123646	2000 YW_{63}	—	December 30, 2000	Socorro	LINEAR	THM	5.2 km	MPC · JPL
123647 Tomáško	2000 YG_{66}	Tomáško	December 31, 2000	Ondřejov	P. Kušnirák, U. Babiaková	NEM	3.0 km	MPC · JPL
123648	2000 YN_{66}	—	December 22, 2000	Socorro	LINEAR	H	900 m	MPC · JPL
123649	2000 YT_{66}	—	December 30, 2000	Kitt Peak	Spacewatch	(5)	2.1 km	MPC · JPL
123650	2000 YH_{71}	—	December 30, 2000	Socorro	LINEAR	·	2.7 km	MPC · JPL
123651	2000 YB_{73}	—	December 30, 2000	Socorro	LINEAR	TIR	6.1 km	MPC · JPL
123652	2000 YC_{73}	—	December 30, 2000	Socorro	LINEAR	·	5.6 km	MPC · JPL
123653	2000 YU_{73}	—	December 30, 2000	Socorro	LINEAR	·	4.7 km	MPC · JPL
123654	2000 YG_{74}	—	December 30, 2000	Socorro	LINEAR	·	2.7 km	MPC · JPL
123655	2000 YK_{74}	—	December 30, 2000	Socorro	LINEAR	·	4.3 km	MPC · JPL
123656	2000 YO_{74}	—	December 30, 2000	Socorro	LINEAR	DOR	4.8 km	MPC · JPL
123657	2000 YL_{75}	—	December 30, 2000	Socorro	LINEAR	KOR	2.9 km	MPC · JPL
123658	2000 YX_{75}	—	December 30, 2000	Socorro	LINEAR	·	4.8 km	MPC · JPL
123659	2000 YJ_{76}	—	December 30, 2000	Socorro	LINEAR	·	2.7 km	MPC · JPL
123660	2000 YM_{77}	—	December 30, 2000	Socorro	LINEAR	KOR	2.8 km	MPC · JPL
123661	2000 YT_{77}	—	December 30, 2000	Socorro	LINEAR	·	2.5 km	MPC · JPL
123662	2000 YM_{78}	—	December 30, 2000	Socorro	LINEAR	·	4.3 km	MPC · JPL
123663	2000 YQ_{78}	—	December 30, 2000	Socorro	LINEAR	(5)	3.2 km	MPC · JPL
123664	2000 YC_{79}	—	December 30, 2000	Socorro	LINEAR	·	4.2 km	MPC · JPL
123665	2000 YL_{79}	—	December 30, 2000	Socorro	LINEAR	·	2.4 km	MPC · JPL
123666	2000 YX_{79}	—	December 30, 2000	Socorro	LINEAR	GEF	4.7 km	MPC · JPL
123667	2000 YR_{80}	—	December 30, 2000	Socorro	LINEAR	·	7.3 km	MPC · JPL
123668	2000 YB_{81}	—	December 30, 2000	Socorro	LINEAR	MRX	2.2 km	MPC · JPL
123669	2000 YH_{82}	—	December 30, 2000	Socorro	LINEAR	·	4.8 km	MPC · JPL
123670	2000 YG_{83}	—	December 30, 2000	Socorro	LINEAR	·	2.6 km	MPC · JPL
123671	2000 YX_{86}	—	December 30, 2000	Socorro	LINEAR	·	5.2 km	MPC · JPL
123672	2000 YA_{87}	—	December 30, 2000	Socorro	LINEAR	·	4.9 km	MPC · JPL
123673	2000 YP_{88}	—	December 30, 2000	Socorro	LINEAR	AGN	2.3 km	MPC · JPL
123674	2000 YA_{90}	—	December 30, 2000	Socorro	LINEAR	·	5.6 km	MPC · JPL
123675	2000 YT_{90}	—	December 30, 2000	Socorro	LINEAR	·	4.9 km	MPC · JPL
123676	2000 YN_{91}	—	December 30, 2000	Socorro	LINEAR	·	3.9 km	MPC · JPL
123677	2000 YO_{91}	—	December 30, 2000	Socorro	LINEAR	EOS	6.9 km	MPC · JPL
123678	2000 YP_{91}	—	December 30, 2000	Socorro	LINEAR	HOF	6.0 km	MPC · JPL
123679	2000 YF_{92}	—	December 30, 2000	Socorro	LINEAR	·	3.3 km	MPC · JPL
123680	2000 YN_{92}	—	December 30, 2000	Socorro	LINEAR	THM	4.8 km	MPC · JPL
123681	2000 YE_{93}	—	December 30, 2000	Socorro	LINEAR	·	5.7 km	MPC · JPL
123682	2000 YA_{95}	—	December 30, 2000	Socorro	LINEAR	AGN	2.4 km	MPC · JPL
123683	2000 YF_{95}	—	December 30, 2000	Socorro	LINEAR	EOS	3.8 km	MPC · JPL
123684	2000 YK_{95}	—	December 30, 2000	Socorro	LINEAR	EMA	6.3 km	MPC · JPL
123685	2000 YN_{96}	—	December 30, 2000	Socorro	LINEAR	EOS	3.8 km	MPC · JPL
123686	2000 YA_{97}	—	December 30, 2000	Socorro	LINEAR	·	5.1 km	MPC · JPL
123687	2000 YA_{98}	—	December 30, 2000	Socorro	LINEAR	H	810 m	MPC · JPL
123688	2000 YG_{99}	—	December 30, 2000	Socorro	LINEAR	HOF	6.0 km	MPC · JPL
123689	2000 YL_{99}	—	December 30, 2000	Socorro	LINEAR	·	7.4 km	MPC · JPL
123690	2000 YO_{99}	—	December 30, 2000	Socorro	LINEAR	·	3.1 km	MPC · JPL
123691	2000 YJ_{101}	—	December 28, 2000	Socorro	LINEAR	·	2.6 km	MPC · JPL
123692	2000 YN_{101}	—	December 28, 2000	Socorro	LINEAR	·	6.4 km	MPC · JPL
123693	2000 YQ_{101}	—	December 28, 2000	Socorro	LINEAR	·	4.3 km	MPC · JPL
123694	2000 YW_{101}	—	December 28, 2000	Socorro	LINEAR	·	3.7 km	MPC · JPL
123695	2000 YC_{102}	—	December 28, 2000	Socorro	LINEAR	·	6.6 km	MPC · JPL
123696	2000 YA_{103}	—	December 28, 2000	Socorro	LINEAR	·	2.8 km	MPC · JPL
123697	2000 YV_{103}	—	December 28, 2000	Socorro	LINEAR	·	5.2 km	MPC · JPL
123698	2000 YQ_{104}	—	December 28, 2000	Socorro	LINEAR	EUP	12 km	MPC · JPL
123699	2000 YF_{105}	—	December 28, 2000	Socorro	LINEAR	·	12 km	MPC · JPL
123700	2000 YF_{107}	—	December 30, 2000	Socorro	LINEAR	·	7.1 km	MPC · JPL

== 123701–123800 ==
back to top

Designation			Discovery			Properties		Ref
Permanent	Provisional	Named after	Date	Site	Discoverer(s)	Category	Diam.	Ref
123701	2000 YQ_{108}	—	December 30, 2000	Socorro	LINEAR	·	5.5 km	MPC · JPL
123702	2000 YE_{109}	—	December 30, 2000	Socorro	LINEAR	·	4.9 km	MPC · JPL
123703	2000 YB_{111}	—	December 30, 2000	Socorro	LINEAR	·	4.3 km	MPC · JPL
123704	2000 YL_{111}	—	December 30, 2000	Socorro	LINEAR	EOS	4.5 km	MPC · JPL
123705	2000 YV_{112}	—	December 30, 2000	Socorro	LINEAR	·	3.0 km	MPC · JPL
123706	2000 YE_{114}	—	December 30, 2000	Socorro	LINEAR	KOR	2.5 km	MPC · JPL
123707	2000 YD_{116}	—	December 30, 2000	Socorro	LINEAR	·	5.2 km	MPC · JPL
123708	2000 YE_{117}	—	December 30, 2000	Socorro	LINEAR	·	3.1 km	MPC · JPL
123709	2000 YZ_{118}	—	December 27, 2000	Anderson Mesa	LONEOS	·	4.9 km	MPC · JPL
123710	2000 YQ_{120}	—	December 19, 2000	Socorro	LINEAR	·	8.5 km	MPC · JPL
123711	2000 YC_{121}	—	December 21, 2000	Socorro	LINEAR	EUN	2.3 km	MPC · JPL
123712	2000 YO_{122}	—	December 28, 2000	Socorro	LINEAR	·	2.1 km	MPC · JPL
123713	2000 YU_{122}	—	December 28, 2000	Socorro	LINEAR	·	3.7 km	MPC · JPL
123714	2000 YH_{124}	—	December 29, 2000	Anderson Mesa	LONEOS	EMA · fast	7.5 km	MPC · JPL
123715	2000 YT_{124}	—	December 29, 2000	Anderson Mesa	LONEOS	slow	2.5 km	MPC · JPL
123716	2000 YP_{125}	—	December 29, 2000	Anderson Mesa	LONEOS	·	5.7 km	MPC · JPL
123717	2000 YX_{126}	—	December 29, 2000	Anderson Mesa	LONEOS	·	2.8 km	MPC · JPL
123718	2000 YS_{128}	—	December 29, 2000	Haleakala	NEAT	·	3.1 km	MPC · JPL
123719	2000 YD_{132}	—	December 30, 2000	Socorro	LINEAR	·	7.7 km	MPC · JPL
123720	2000 YP_{133}	—	December 31, 2000	Kitt Peak	Spacewatch	HOF	5.1 km	MPC · JPL
123721	2000 YZ_{133}	—	December 31, 2000	Haleakala	NEAT	GAL	3.3 km	MPC · JPL
123722	2000 YX_{134}	—	December 16, 2000	Anderson Mesa	LONEOS	·	3.0 km	MPC · JPL
123723	2000 YD_{135}	—	December 17, 2000	Anderson Mesa	LONEOS	(5)	2.4 km	MPC · JPL
123724	2000 YK_{135}	—	December 17, 2000	Socorro	LINEAR	·	5.1 km	MPC · JPL
123725	2000 YU_{135}	—	December 21, 2000	Socorro	LINEAR	(13314)	4.4 km	MPC · JPL
123726	2000 YK_{136}	—	December 23, 2000	Anderson Mesa	LONEOS	·	4.9 km	MPC · JPL
123727	2000 YQ_{137}	—	December 23, 2000	Socorro	LINEAR	·	11 km	MPC · JPL
123728	2000 YS_{142}	—	December 17, 2000	Socorro	LINEAR	·	5.2 km	MPC · JPL
123729	2001 AM_{5}	—	January 2, 2001	Socorro	LINEAR	·	3.7 km	MPC · JPL
123730	2001 AS_{7}	—	January 2, 2001	Socorro	LINEAR	·	5.8 km	MPC · JPL
123731	2001 AH_{8}	—	January 2, 2001	Socorro	LINEAR	·	5.8 km	MPC · JPL
123732	2001 AU_{8}	—	January 2, 2001	Socorro	LINEAR	EOS	4.0 km	MPC · JPL
123733	2001 AT_{9}	—	January 2, 2001	Socorro	LINEAR	EUN	2.7 km	MPC · JPL
123734	2001 AE_{10}	—	January 2, 2001	Socorro	LINEAR	·	5.4 km	MPC · JPL
123735	2001 AH_{10}	—	January 2, 2001	Socorro	LINEAR	·	6.5 km	MPC · JPL
123736	2001 AQ_{11}	—	January 2, 2001	Socorro	LINEAR	·	5.1 km	MPC · JPL
123737	2001 AW_{11}	—	January 2, 2001	Socorro	LINEAR	·	6.5 km	MPC · JPL
123738	2001 AZ_{14}	—	January 2, 2001	Socorro	LINEAR	·	2.9 km	MPC · JPL
123739	2001 AC_{18}	—	January 2, 2001	Socorro	LINEAR	·	7.2 km	MPC · JPL
123740	2001 AO_{18}	—	January 2, 2001	Socorro	LINEAR	HYG	7.4 km	MPC · JPL
123741	2001 AN_{19}	—	January 4, 2001	Bohyunsan	Jeon, Y.-B., Lee, B.-C.	·	1.9 km	MPC · JPL
123742	2001 AQ_{20}	—	January 3, 2001	Socorro	LINEAR	ADE	4.5 km	MPC · JPL
123743	2001 AT_{21}	—	January 3, 2001	Socorro	LINEAR	·	4.3 km	MPC · JPL
123744	2001 AT_{22}	—	January 3, 2001	Socorro	LINEAR	·	3.2 km	MPC · JPL
123745	2001 AA_{23}	—	January 3, 2001	Socorro	LINEAR	·	5.3 km	MPC · JPL
123746	2001 AC_{23}	—	January 3, 2001	Socorro	LINEAR	·	4.7 km	MPC · JPL
123747	2001 AV_{25}	—	January 4, 2001	Fair Oaks Ranch	J. V. McClusky	H	900 m	MPC · JPL
123748	2001 AJ_{26}	—	January 5, 2001	Socorro	LINEAR	·	2.3 km	MPC · JPL
123749	2001 AK_{26}	—	January 5, 2001	Socorro	LINEAR	NAE	5.5 km	MPC · JPL
123750	2001 AT_{26}	—	January 5, 2001	Socorro	LINEAR	·	3.0 km	MPC · JPL
123751	2001 AR_{27}	—	January 5, 2001	Socorro	LINEAR	GEF	2.6 km	MPC · JPL
123752	2001 AB_{28}	—	January 5, 2001	Socorro	LINEAR	·	4.5 km	MPC · JPL
123753	2001 AP_{32}	—	January 4, 2001	Socorro	LINEAR	GEF	3.1 km	MPC · JPL
123754	2001 AR_{32}	—	January 4, 2001	Socorro	LINEAR	(5) · slow	3.7 km	MPC · JPL
123755	2001 AD_{33}	—	January 4, 2001	Socorro	LINEAR	JUN	2.8 km	MPC · JPL
123756	2001 AY_{36}	—	January 5, 2001	Socorro	LINEAR	(18466)	2.1 km	MPC · JPL
123757	2001 AY_{37}	—	January 5, 2001	Socorro	LINEAR	·	4.7 km	MPC · JPL
123758	2001 AU_{39}	—	January 3, 2001	Anderson Mesa	LONEOS	·	3.5 km	MPC · JPL
123759	2001 AC_{40}	—	January 3, 2001	Anderson Mesa	LONEOS	H	830 m	MPC · JPL
123760	2001 AP_{40}	—	January 3, 2001	Anderson Mesa	LONEOS	H	920 m	MPC · JPL
123761	2001 AD_{41}	—	January 3, 2001	Socorro	LINEAR	·	2.4 km	MPC · JPL
123762	2001 AU_{41}	—	January 3, 2001	Socorro	LINEAR	H	1.4 km	MPC · JPL
123763	2001 AH_{42}	—	January 3, 2001	Anderson Mesa	LONEOS	H	1.2 km	MPC · JPL
123764	2001 AW_{43}	—	January 14, 2001	Kitt Peak	Spacewatch	AGN	2.3 km	MPC · JPL
123765	2001 AJ_{46}	—	January 15, 2001	Socorro	LINEAR	H	990 m	MPC · JPL
123766	2001 AH_{48}	—	January 15, 2001	Bergisch Gladbach	W. Bickel	·	2.9 km	MPC · JPL
123767	2001 AR_{48}	—	January 4, 2001	Socorro	LINEAR	H	1.3 km	MPC · JPL
123768	2001 AG_{50}	—	January 14, 2001	Kitt Peak	Spacewatch	·	2.5 km	MPC · JPL
123769	2001 AZ_{50}	—	January 15, 2001	Kitt Peak	Spacewatch	·	2.6 km	MPC · JPL
123770	2001 AN_{53}	—	January 4, 2001	Kitt Peak	Spacewatch	·	4.0 km	MPC · JPL
123771	2001 BL	—	January 17, 2001	Oizumi	T. Kobayashi	AGN	2.4 km	MPC · JPL
123772	2001 BQ_{2}	—	January 17, 2001	Socorro	LINEAR	·	3.0 km	MPC · JPL
123773	2001 BB_{6}	—	January 18, 2001	Socorro	LINEAR	·	9.4 km	MPC · JPL
123774	2001 BQ_{6}	—	January 19, 2001	Socorro	LINEAR	HYG	5.1 km	MPC · JPL
123775	2001 BA_{7}	—	January 19, 2001	Socorro	LINEAR	·	4.0 km	MPC · JPL
123776	2001 BF_{7}	—	January 19, 2001	Socorro	LINEAR	·	2.7 km	MPC · JPL
123777	2001 BH_{7}	—	January 19, 2001	Socorro	LINEAR	·	6.6 km	MPC · JPL
123778	2001 BN_{12}	—	January 19, 2001	Kitt Peak	Spacewatch	·	2.0 km	MPC · JPL
123779	2001 BW_{12}	—	January 18, 2001	Socorro	LINEAR	·	8.4 km	MPC · JPL
123780	2001 BJ_{13}	—	January 21, 2001	Socorro	LINEAR	AGN	1.8 km	MPC · JPL
123781	2001 BU_{14}	—	January 21, 2001	Oizumi	T. Kobayashi	EOS	3.4 km	MPC · JPL
123782	2001 BM_{15}	—	January 21, 2001	Oizumi	T. Kobayashi	·	8.8 km	MPC · JPL
123783	2001 BP_{16}	—	January 18, 2001	Socorro	LINEAR	BRA	2.9 km	MPC · JPL
123784	2001 BE_{17}	—	January 19, 2001	Socorro	LINEAR	·	4.5 km	MPC · JPL
123785	2001 BP_{17}	—	January 19, 2001	Socorro	LINEAR	·	2.9 km	MPC · JPL
123786	2001 BS_{17}	—	January 19, 2001	Socorro	LINEAR	·	4.9 km	MPC · JPL
123787	2001 BG_{22}	—	January 20, 2001	Socorro	LINEAR	·	2.9 km	MPC · JPL
123788	2001 BZ_{22}	—	January 20, 2001	Socorro	LINEAR	·	2.2 km	MPC · JPL
123789	2001 BL_{25}	—	January 20, 2001	Socorro	LINEAR	·	4.1 km	MPC · JPL
123790	2001 BD_{35}	—	January 20, 2001	Socorro	LINEAR	·	4.7 km	MPC · JPL
123791	2001 BH_{35}	—	January 20, 2001	Socorro	LINEAR	·	4.7 km	MPC · JPL
123792	2001 BU_{37}	—	January 21, 2001	Socorro	LINEAR	KOR	2.7 km	MPC · JPL
123793	2001 BG_{39}	—	January 19, 2001	Kitt Peak	Spacewatch	·	3.8 km	MPC · JPL
123794 Deadwood	2001 BE_{42}	Deadwood	January 25, 2001	Badlands	Dyvig, R.	·	4.3 km	MPC · JPL
123795	2001 BF_{42}	—	January 25, 2001	Badlands	Dyvig, R.	·	4.2 km	MPC · JPL
123796	2001 BD_{43}	—	January 19, 2001	Socorro	LINEAR	·	7.4 km	MPC · JPL
123797	2001 BV_{43}	—	January 19, 2001	Socorro	LINEAR	EOS	3.3 km	MPC · JPL
123798	2001 BL_{47}	—	January 21, 2001	Socorro	LINEAR	EMA	5.8 km	MPC · JPL
123799	2001 BK_{48}	—	January 21, 2001	Socorro	LINEAR	CYB	11 km	MPC · JPL
123800	2001 BL_{48}	—	January 21, 2001	Socorro	LINEAR	·	6.3 km	MPC · JPL

== 123801–123900 ==
back to top

Designation			Discovery			Properties		Ref
Permanent	Provisional	Named after	Date	Site	Discoverer(s)	Category	Diam.	Ref
123801	2001 BK_{54}	—	January 18, 2001	Kitt Peak	Spacewatch	·	6.6 km	MPC · JPL
123802	2001 BC_{56}	—	January 19, 2001	Socorro	LINEAR	·	3.0 km	MPC · JPL
123803	2001 BP_{56}	—	January 19, 2001	Socorro	LINEAR	·	5.4 km	MPC · JPL
123804	2001 BA_{60}	—	January 26, 2001	Socorro	LINEAR	slow	5.5 km	MPC · JPL
123805	2001 BZ_{60}	—	January 26, 2001	Socorro	LINEAR	H	1.5 km	MPC · JPL
123806	2001 BY_{63}	—	January 29, 2001	Socorro	LINEAR	·	2.7 km	MPC · JPL
123807	2001 BH_{64}	—	January 29, 2001	Socorro	LINEAR	·	4.5 km	MPC · JPL
123808	2001 BJ_{64}	—	January 29, 2001	Socorro	LINEAR	·	8.0 km	MPC · JPL
123809	2001 BY_{64}	—	January 31, 2001	Haleakala	NEAT	·	5.9 km	MPC · JPL
123810	2001 BM_{65}	—	January 26, 2001	Socorro	LINEAR	·	6.7 km	MPC · JPL
123811	2001 BC_{67}	—	January 30, 2001	Socorro	LINEAR	·	5.9 km	MPC · JPL
123812	2001 BE_{67}	—	January 30, 2001	Socorro	LINEAR	·	6.7 km	MPC · JPL
123813	2001 BC_{68}	—	January 31, 2001	Socorro	LINEAR	·	7.2 km	MPC · JPL
123814	2001 BC_{71}	—	January 29, 2001	Socorro	LINEAR	·	6.0 km	MPC · JPL
123815	2001 BD_{72}	—	January 31, 2001	Socorro	LINEAR	·	3.1 km	MPC · JPL
123816	2001 BU_{73}	—	January 29, 2001	Kvistaberg	Uppsala-DLR Asteroid Survey	PAD	4.5 km	MPC · JPL
123817	2001 BG_{74}	—	January 31, 2001	Kitt Peak	Spacewatch	·	4.1 km	MPC · JPL
123818 Helenzier	2001 BC_{75}	Helenzier	January 31, 2001	Junk Bond	D. Healy	KOR	2.5 km	MPC · JPL
123819	2001 BS_{77}	—	January 25, 2001	Kitt Peak	Spacewatch	·	3.9 km	MPC · JPL
123820	2001 BV_{78}	—	January 21, 2001	Socorro	LINEAR	EOS	4.0 km	MPC · JPL
123821	2001 BH_{80}	—	January 20, 2001	Socorro	LINEAR	·	4.2 km	MPC · JPL
123822	2001 BS_{80}	—	January 19, 2001	Haleakala	NEAT	URS	6.2 km	MPC · JPL
123823	2001 BW_{80}	—	January 19, 2001	Kitt Peak	Spacewatch	·	3.9 km	MPC · JPL
123824	2001 CU_{3}	—	February 1, 2001	Socorro	LINEAR	·	8.2 km	MPC · JPL
123825	2001 CL_{4}	—	February 1, 2001	Socorro	LINEAR	DOR	7.1 km	MPC · JPL
123826	2001 CH_{6}	—	February 1, 2001	Socorro	LINEAR	·	4.9 km	MPC · JPL
123827	2001 CJ_{6}	—	February 1, 2001	Socorro	LINEAR	URS	8.1 km	MPC · JPL
123828	2001 CJ_{9}	—	February 1, 2001	Socorro	LINEAR	EOS	4.3 km	MPC · JPL
123829	2001 CN_{9}	—	February 1, 2001	Socorro	LINEAR	·	3.7 km	MPC · JPL
123830	2001 CU_{10}	—	February 1, 2001	Socorro	LINEAR	EOS	4.2 km	MPC · JPL
123831	2001 CB_{13}	—	February 1, 2001	Socorro	LINEAR	·	5.4 km	MPC · JPL
123832	2001 CU_{14}	—	February 1, 2001	Socorro	LINEAR	·	4.2 km	MPC · JPL
123833	2001 CF_{15}	—	February 1, 2001	Socorro	LINEAR	·	6.2 km	MPC · JPL
123834	2001 CW_{15}	—	February 1, 2001	Socorro	LINEAR	·	5.7 km	MPC · JPL
123835	2001 CP_{16}	—	February 1, 2001	Socorro	LINEAR	·	3.3 km	MPC · JPL
123836	2001 CS_{18}	—	February 2, 2001	Socorro	LINEAR	(31811)	6.1 km	MPC · JPL
123837	2001 CO_{20}	—	February 3, 2001	Socorro	LINEAR	H	1.3 km	MPC · JPL
123838	2001 CX_{20}	—	February 4, 2001	Socorro	LINEAR	·	7.5 km	MPC · JPL
123839	2001 CD_{22}	—	February 1, 2001	Anderson Mesa	LONEOS	·	6.6 km	MPC · JPL
123840	2001 CF_{22}	—	February 1, 2001	Anderson Mesa	LONEOS	HYG	5.1 km	MPC · JPL
123841	2001 CR_{22}	—	February 1, 2001	Anderson Mesa	LONEOS	·	5.9 km	MPC · JPL
123842	2001 CT_{27}	—	February 2, 2001	Anderson Mesa	LONEOS	EUP	5.9 km	MPC · JPL
123843	2001 CZ_{27}	—	February 2, 2001	Anderson Mesa	LONEOS	·	7.4 km	MPC · JPL
123844	2001 CN_{29}	—	February 2, 2001	Anderson Mesa	LONEOS	·	5.1 km	MPC · JPL
123845	2001 CD_{30}	—	February 2, 2001	Anderson Mesa	LONEOS	·	3.8 km	MPC · JPL
123846	2001 CQ_{31}	—	February 4, 2001	Socorro	LINEAR	H	1.3 km	MPC · JPL
123847	2001 CO_{32}	—	February 5, 2001	Socorro	LINEAR	·	5.3 km	MPC · JPL
123848	2001 CX_{34}	—	February 13, 2001	Socorro	LINEAR	·	4.5 km	MPC · JPL
123849	2001 CS_{35}	—	February 13, 2001	Socorro	LINEAR	H	1.3 km	MPC · JPL
123850	2001 CV_{36}	—	February 13, 2001	Kitt Peak	Spacewatch	·	5.0 km	MPC · JPL
123851	2001 CB_{37}	—	February 14, 2001	Ondřejov	L. Kotková	·	3.8 km	MPC · JPL
123852 Jánboďa	2001 CM_{37}	Jánboďa	February 15, 2001	Modra	Gajdoš, S., A. Galád	·	3.4 km	MPC · JPL
123853	2001 CP_{37}	—	February 15, 2001	Socorro	LINEAR	·	6.3 km	MPC · JPL
123854	2001 CB_{38}	—	February 15, 2001	Socorro	LINEAR	·	3.4 km	MPC · JPL
123855	2001 CE_{38}	—	February 15, 2001	Socorro	LINEAR	T_{j} (2.98)	11 km	MPC · JPL
123856	2001 CD_{39}	—	February 13, 2001	Socorro	LINEAR	·	5.7 km	MPC · JPL
123857	2001 CB_{43}	—	February 15, 2001	Socorro	LINEAR	·	8.6 km	MPC · JPL
123858	2001 CB_{48}	—	February 13, 2001	Kitt Peak	Spacewatch	EOS	3.2 km	MPC · JPL
123859	2001 CO_{48}	—	February 11, 2001	Cima Ekar	ADAS	·	7.4 km	MPC · JPL
123860 Davederrick	2001 DX	Davederrick	February 16, 2001	Nogales	M. Schwartz, P. R. Holvorcem	EMA	8.8 km	MPC · JPL
123861	2001 DB_{2}	—	February 16, 2001	Kitt Peak	Spacewatch	·	3.7 km	MPC · JPL
123862	2001 DF_{3}	—	February 16, 2001	Socorro	LINEAR	H	1.1 km	MPC · JPL
123863	2001 DD_{5}	—	February 16, 2001	Socorro	LINEAR	EOS	3.9 km	MPC · JPL
123864	2001 DV_{6}	—	February 16, 2001	Črni Vrh	Matičič, S.	·	5.4 km	MPC · JPL
123865	2001 DK_{7}	—	February 16, 2001	Oizumi	T. Kobayashi	HYG	6.6 km	MPC · JPL
123866	2001 DO_{9}	—	February 16, 2001	Socorro	LINEAR	EOS	3.3 km	MPC · JPL
123867	2001 DE_{12}	—	February 17, 2001	Socorro	LINEAR	·	2.7 km	MPC · JPL
123868	2001 DJ_{13}	—	February 19, 2001	Oizumi	T. Kobayashi	·	8.2 km	MPC · JPL
123869	2001 DR_{13}	—	February 19, 2001	Oizumi	T. Kobayashi	·	7.3 km	MPC · JPL
123870	2001 DD_{19}	—	February 16, 2001	Socorro	LINEAR	·	5.1 km	MPC · JPL
123871	2001 DM_{22}	—	February 16, 2001	Socorro	LINEAR	(10654)	7.1 km	MPC · JPL
123872	2001 DH_{23}	—	February 17, 2001	Socorro	LINEAR	·	3.2 km	MPC · JPL
123873	2001 DC_{27}	—	February 17, 2001	Socorro	LINEAR	·	3.3 km	MPC · JPL
123874	2001 DQ_{28}	—	February 17, 2001	Socorro	LINEAR	·	4.5 km	MPC · JPL
123875	2001 DQ_{29}	—	February 17, 2001	Socorro	LINEAR	HYG	5.3 km	MPC · JPL
123876	2001 DV_{29}	—	February 17, 2001	Socorro	LINEAR	EOS	4.4 km	MPC · JPL
123877	2001 DM_{31}	—	February 17, 2001	Socorro	LINEAR	·	5.7 km	MPC · JPL
123878	2001 DQ_{31}	—	February 17, 2001	Socorro	LINEAR	·	5.8 km	MPC · JPL
123879	2001 DP_{34}	—	February 19, 2001	Socorro	LINEAR	·	5.5 km	MPC · JPL
123880	2001 DG_{35}	—	February 19, 2001	Socorro	LINEAR	·	3.5 km	MPC · JPL
123881	2001 DH_{37}	—	February 19, 2001	Socorro	LINEAR	·	6.3 km	MPC · JPL
123882	2001 DS_{39}	—	February 19, 2001	Socorro	LINEAR	·	4.6 km	MPC · JPL
123883	2001 DE_{40}	—	February 19, 2001	Socorro	LINEAR	·	3.2 km	MPC · JPL
123884	2001 DJ_{42}	—	February 19, 2001	Socorro	LINEAR	EOS	3.9 km	MPC · JPL
123885	2001 DM_{42}	—	February 19, 2001	Socorro	LINEAR	KOR	2.8 km	MPC · JPL
123886	2001 DE_{45}	—	February 19, 2001	Socorro	LINEAR	·	6.5 km	MPC · JPL
123887	2001 DX_{45}	—	February 19, 2001	Socorro	LINEAR	·	4.4 km	MPC · JPL
123888	2001 DJ_{49}	—	February 16, 2001	Socorro	LINEAR	VER	5.2 km	MPC · JPL
123889	2001 DT_{49}	—	February 16, 2001	Socorro	LINEAR	EOS	3.8 km	MPC · JPL
123890	2001 DB_{51}	—	February 16, 2001	Socorro	LINEAR	·	2.9 km	MPC · JPL
123891	2001 DL_{51}	—	February 16, 2001	Socorro	LINEAR	·	3.0 km	MPC · JPL
123892	2001 DM_{51}	—	February 16, 2001	Socorro	LINEAR	·	6.0 km	MPC · JPL
123893	2001 DW_{52}	—	February 17, 2001	Socorro	LINEAR	DOR	4.7 km	MPC · JPL
123894	2001 DR_{53}	—	February 20, 2001	Socorro	LINEAR	·	4.0 km	MPC · JPL
123895	2001 DW_{56}	—	February 16, 2001	Kitt Peak	Spacewatch	·	5.1 km	MPC · JPL
123896	2001 DX_{58}	—	February 21, 2001	Socorro	LINEAR	H	1.0 km	MPC · JPL
123897	2001 DG_{60}	—	February 19, 2001	Socorro	LINEAR	HOF	3.8 km	MPC · JPL
123898	2001 DU_{61}	—	February 19, 2001	Socorro	LINEAR	DOR	6.5 km	MPC · JPL
123899	2001 DP_{62}	—	February 19, 2001	Socorro	LINEAR	·	5.8 km	MPC · JPL
123900	2001 DD_{63}	—	February 19, 2001	Socorro	LINEAR	EOS	4.2 km	MPC · JPL

== 123901–124000 ==
back to top

Designation			Discovery			Properties		Ref
Permanent	Provisional	Named after	Date	Site	Discoverer(s)	Category	Diam.	Ref
123901	2001 DB_{66}	—	February 19, 2001	Socorro	LINEAR	·	3.5 km	MPC · JPL
123902	2001 DH_{68}	—	February 19, 2001	Socorro	LINEAR	·	4.4 km	MPC · JPL
123903	2001 DC_{70}	—	February 19, 2001	Socorro	LINEAR	·	5.7 km	MPC · JPL
123904	2001 DZ_{75}	—	February 20, 2001	Socorro	LINEAR	·	3.8 km	MPC · JPL
123905	2001 DR_{76}	—	February 20, 2001	Socorro	LINEAR	·	5.5 km	MPC · JPL
123906	2001 DS_{76}	—	February 21, 2001	Socorro	LINEAR	EOS	3.8 km	MPC · JPL
123907	2001 DB_{78}	—	February 22, 2001	Kitt Peak	Spacewatch	EOS	3.2 km	MPC · JPL
123908	2001 DM_{79}	—	February 19, 2001	Haleakala	NEAT	EOS	4.0 km	MPC · JPL
123909	2001 DQ_{83}	—	February 23, 2001	Kitt Peak	Spacewatch	·	3.2 km	MPC · JPL
123910	2001 DT_{88}	—	February 27, 2001	Kitt Peak	Spacewatch	·	5.5 km	MPC · JPL
123911	2001 DF_{89}	—	February 27, 2001	Kitt Peak	Spacewatch	EOS	3.1 km	MPC · JPL
123912	2001 DM_{91}	—	February 20, 2001	Socorro	LINEAR	·	4.0 km	MPC · JPL
123913	2001 DW_{93}	—	February 19, 2001	Socorro	LINEAR	·	5.1 km	MPC · JPL
123914	2001 DP_{94}	—	February 19, 2001	Socorro	LINEAR	·	7.3 km	MPC · JPL
123915	2001 DK_{95}	—	February 18, 2001	Haleakala	NEAT	LIX	9.2 km	MPC · JPL
123916	2001 DL_{96}	—	February 17, 2001	Socorro	LINEAR	·	3.5 km	MPC · JPL
123917	2001 DY_{97}	—	February 17, 2001	Socorro	LINEAR	·	8.2 km	MPC · JPL
123918	2001 DM_{98}	—	February 17, 2001	Haleakala	NEAT	·	7.1 km	MPC · JPL
123919	2001 DQ_{98}	—	February 17, 2001	Socorro	LINEAR	EOS	4.3 km	MPC · JPL
123920	2001 DW_{99}	—	February 17, 2001	Socorro	LINEAR	H	1.8 km	MPC · JPL
123921	2001 DT_{104}	—	February 16, 2001	Anderson Mesa	LONEOS	EOS	3.2 km	MPC · JPL
123922	2001 DJ_{106}	—	February 22, 2001	Socorro	LINEAR	·	5.2 km	MPC · JPL
123923	2001 DQ_{106}	—	February 27, 2001	Cima Ekar	ADAS	·	8.8 km	MPC · JPL
123924	2001 ET_{1}	—	March 1, 2001	Socorro	LINEAR	·	4.1 km	MPC · JPL
123925	2001 EA_{2}	—	March 1, 2001	Socorro	LINEAR	URS	7.9 km	MPC · JPL
123926	2001 EB_{3}	—	March 3, 2001	Kitt Peak	Spacewatch	THM	3.6 km	MPC · JPL
123927	2001 ER_{4}	—	March 2, 2001	Anderson Mesa	LONEOS	·	5.3 km	MPC · JPL
123928	2001 ED_{6}	—	March 2, 2001	Anderson Mesa	LONEOS	·	4.6 km	MPC · JPL
123929	2001 EM_{6}	—	March 2, 2001	Anderson Mesa	LONEOS	AEG	5.0 km	MPC · JPL
123930	2001 EP_{6}	—	March 2, 2001	Anderson Mesa	LONEOS	·	7.9 km	MPC · JPL
123931	2001 ED_{8}	—	March 2, 2001	Anderson Mesa	LONEOS	(31811)	6.4 km	MPC · JPL
123932	2001 EV_{11}	—	March 3, 2001	Socorro	LINEAR	·	3.7 km	MPC · JPL
123933	2001 EE_{14}	—	March 15, 2001	Socorro	LINEAR	·	5.9 km	MPC · JPL
123934	2001 EU_{14}	—	March 15, 2001	Socorro	LINEAR	fast	6.7 km	MPC · JPL
123935	2001 EX_{14}	—	March 15, 2001	Socorro	LINEAR	·	7.8 km	MPC · JPL
123936	2001 EA_{15}	—	March 15, 2001	Socorro	LINEAR	·	4.5 km	MPC · JPL
123937	2001 EX_{16}	—	March 3, 2001	Socorro	LINEAR	H	1.7 km	MPC · JPL
123938	2001 EB_{17}	—	March 13, 2001	Socorro	LINEAR	H	1.2 km	MPC · JPL
123939	2001 EP_{17}	—	March 15, 2001	Socorro	LINEAR	EUP	7.1 km	MPC · JPL
123940	2001 EL_{18}	—	March 15, 2001	Haleakala	NEAT	·	6.9 km	MPC · JPL
123941	2001 EM_{18}	—	March 13, 2001	Anderson Mesa	LONEOS	TIR	6.7 km	MPC · JPL
123942	2001 EV_{18}	—	March 14, 2001	Anderson Mesa	LONEOS	EUN	2.6 km	MPC · JPL
123943	2001 EW_{19}	—	March 15, 2001	Kitt Peak	Spacewatch	·	3.3 km	MPC · JPL
123944	2001 EU_{20}	—	March 15, 2001	Anderson Mesa	LONEOS	EOS	4.5 km	MPC · JPL
123945	2001 EM_{21}	—	March 15, 2001	Anderson Mesa	LONEOS	HYG	5.9 km	MPC · JPL
123946	2001 ER_{23}	—	March 15, 2001	Haleakala	NEAT	·	6.2 km	MPC · JPL
123947	2001 EK_{24}	—	March 3, 2001	Socorro	LINEAR	H	1.2 km	MPC · JPL
123948	2001 EQ_{25}	—	March 15, 2001	Haleakala	NEAT	EOS	3.5 km	MPC · JPL
123949	2001 EC_{26}	—	March 2, 2001	Anderson Mesa	LONEOS	EOS	4.0 km	MPC · JPL
123950	2001 FJ_{3}	—	March 18, 2001	Socorro	LINEAR	·	4.7 km	MPC · JPL
123951	2001 FC_{4}	—	March 18, 2001	Oizumi	T. Kobayashi	·	4.9 km	MPC · JPL
123952	2001 FX_{4}	—	March 18, 2001	Socorro	LINEAR	H	1.1 km	MPC · JPL
123953	2001 FT_{7}	—	March 20, 2001	Kitt Peak	Spacewatch	·	3.7 km	MPC · JPL
123954	2001 FV_{7}	—	March 18, 2001	Socorro	LINEAR	H	1.1 km	MPC · JPL
123955	2001 FC_{10}	—	March 17, 2001	Gnosca	S. Sposetti	·	4.4 km	MPC · JPL
123956	2001 FY_{10}	—	March 19, 2001	Anderson Mesa	LONEOS	·	6.1 km	MPC · JPL
123957	2001 FD_{11}	—	March 19, 2001	Anderson Mesa	LONEOS	EOS	4.5 km	MPC · JPL
123958	2001 FC_{12}	—	March 19, 2001	Anderson Mesa	LONEOS	H	1.0 km	MPC · JPL
123959	2001 FH_{12}	—	March 19, 2001	Anderson Mesa	LONEOS	·	6.9 km	MPC · JPL
123960	2001 FF_{13}	—	March 19, 2001	Anderson Mesa	LONEOS	THM	4.4 km	MPC · JPL
123961	2001 FW_{13}	—	March 19, 2001	Anderson Mesa	LONEOS	HYG	7.8 km	MPC · JPL
123962	2001 FL_{14}	—	March 19, 2001	Anderson Mesa	LONEOS	·	5.2 km	MPC · JPL
123963	2001 FU_{15}	—	March 19, 2001	Anderson Mesa	LONEOS	·	4.2 km	MPC · JPL
123964	2001 FZ_{16}	—	March 19, 2001	Anderson Mesa	LONEOS	·	6.1 km	MPC · JPL
123965	2001 FD_{17}	—	March 19, 2001	Anderson Mesa	LONEOS	KOR	2.8 km	MPC · JPL
123966	2001 FF_{22}	—	March 21, 2001	Anderson Mesa	LONEOS	·	6.8 km	MPC · JPL
123967	2001 FX_{22}	—	March 21, 2001	Anderson Mesa	LONEOS	·	3.7 km	MPC · JPL
123968	2001 FQ_{26}	—	March 18, 2001	Socorro	LINEAR	EOS	4.0 km	MPC · JPL
123969	2001 FM_{27}	—	March 18, 2001	Socorro	LINEAR	·	4.3 km	MPC · JPL
123970	2001 FQ_{27}	—	March 18, 2001	Socorro	LINEAR	·	8.5 km	MPC · JPL
123971	2001 FX_{27}	—	March 19, 2001	Socorro	LINEAR	EOS	4.0 km	MPC · JPL
123972	2001 FN_{28}	—	March 19, 2001	Socorro	LINEAR	·	5.6 km	MPC · JPL
123973	2001 FQ_{28}	—	March 19, 2001	Socorro	LINEAR	·	4.8 km	MPC · JPL
123974	2001 FW_{28}	—	March 19, 2001	Socorro	LINEAR	HYG	6.8 km	MPC · JPL
123975	2001 FV_{30}	—	March 21, 2001	Haleakala	NEAT	·	5.8 km	MPC · JPL
123976	2001 FV_{33}	—	March 18, 2001	Socorro	LINEAR	·	4.8 km	MPC · JPL
123977	2001 FO_{34}	—	March 18, 2001	Socorro	LINEAR	·	4.0 km	MPC · JPL
123978	2001 FF_{37}	—	March 18, 2001	Socorro	LINEAR	·	5.1 km	MPC · JPL
123979	2001 FB_{38}	—	March 18, 2001	Socorro	LINEAR	LIX	8.6 km	MPC · JPL
123980	2001 FH_{39}	—	March 18, 2001	Socorro	LINEAR	·	3.9 km	MPC · JPL
123981	2001 FJ_{42}	—	March 18, 2001	Socorro	LINEAR	·	4.3 km	MPC · JPL
123982	2001 FA_{44}	—	March 18, 2001	Socorro	LINEAR	·	7.7 km	MPC · JPL
123983	2001 FW_{46}	—	March 18, 2001	Socorro	LINEAR	·	4.5 km	MPC · JPL
123984	2001 FQ_{51}	—	March 18, 2001	Socorro	LINEAR	·	8.4 km	MPC · JPL
123985	2001 FK_{52}	—	March 18, 2001	Socorro	LINEAR	·	4.9 km	MPC · JPL
123986	2001 FC_{56}	—	March 23, 2001	Socorro	LINEAR	·	4.9 km	MPC · JPL
123987	2001 FO_{58}	—	March 24, 2001	Haleakala	NEAT	·	8.2 km	MPC · JPL
123988	2001 FF_{62}	—	March 19, 2001	Socorro	LINEAR	EOS	3.5 km	MPC · JPL
123989	2001 FG_{62}	—	March 19, 2001	Socorro	LINEAR	EOS	5.5 km	MPC · JPL
123990	2001 FH_{62}	—	March 19, 2001	Socorro	LINEAR	·	5.6 km	MPC · JPL
123991	2001 FZ_{62}	—	March 19, 2001	Socorro	LINEAR	·	7.3 km	MPC · JPL
123992	2001 FL_{63}	—	March 19, 2001	Socorro	LINEAR	·	3.2 km	MPC · JPL
123993	2001 FK_{64}	—	March 19, 2001	Socorro	LINEAR	·	9.0 km	MPC · JPL
123994	2001 FL_{64}	—	March 19, 2001	Socorro	LINEAR	·	5.5 km	MPC · JPL
123995	2001 FM_{64}	—	March 19, 2001	Socorro	LINEAR	·	4.3 km	MPC · JPL
123996	2001 FV_{64}	—	March 19, 2001	Socorro	LINEAR	EOS	4.5 km	MPC · JPL
123997	2001 FC_{68}	—	March 19, 2001	Socorro	LINEAR	BRA	3.8 km	MPC · JPL
123998	2001 FP_{70}	—	March 19, 2001	Socorro	LINEAR	THM	5.3 km	MPC · JPL
123999	2001 FS_{71}	—	March 19, 2001	Socorro	LINEAR	·	2.4 km	MPC · JPL
124000	2001 FP_{72}	—	March 19, 2001	Socorro	LINEAR	·	5.5 km	MPC · JPL

back to top

== See also ==
- Meanings of minor-planet names: 123001–124000
