= Ulrika Babiaková =

Slovak astronomer

Aleksandra
- Born: 3 April 1976
- Died: 3 November 2002 (aged 26)
- Occupation: Astronomer
- Known for: Discovery of 14 asteroids during 1998–2001
- Spouse: Peter Kušnirák

Minor planets discovered: 14
15053 Bochníček^{[1]}	17 December 1998
22185 Štiavnica^{[2]}	29 December 2000
22644 Matejbel^{[1]}	27 July 1998
(49436) 1998 YX_{2}^{[1]}	17 December 1998
(72062) 2000 YR_{17}^{[2]}	24 December 2000
(72070) 2000 YC_{33}^{[2]}	31 December 2000
(82809) 2001 QK_{33}^{[2]}	17 August 2001
(82908) 2001 QU_{100}^{[2]}	19 August 2001
(104650) 2000 GY_{132}^{[2]}	9 April 2000
(109096) 2001 QJ_{33}^{[2]}	16 August 2001
(123613) 2000 YQ_{17}^{[2]}	24 December 2000
123647 Tomáško^{[2]}	31 December 2000
(165712) 2001 QV_{33}^{[2]}	17 August 2001
(334076) 2001 QW_{33}^{[2]}	17 August 2001
^{1} with Petr Pravec^{2} with Peter Kušnirák

Ulrika Babiaková (3 April 1976 – 3 November 2002) was a Slovak astronomer and discoverer of minor planets from Banská Štiavnica, Slovakia. She is credited by the Minor Planet Center with the discovery and co-discovery of 14 asteroids during 1998–2001.

Babiaková died at the age of 26 in an accident.

The main-belt asteroid 32531 Ulrikababiaková, discovered by astronomer and husband Peter Kušnirák in 2001, was named in her memory on 8 October 2014 (M.P.C. 90379).
