= Peter Kušnirák =

Slovak astronomer (born 1974)

Minor planets discovered: 291
see § List of discovered minor planets

Peter Kušnirák (born 1974) is a Slovak astronomer, discoverer of minor planets, and a prolific photometrist of light-curves at Ondřejov Observatory in the Czech Republic. He was married to Slovak astronomer Ulrika Babiaková with whom he discovered 123647 Tomáško, named after their son Tomáško.

He was the principal observer to discover that the two main-belt asteroids 3073 Kursk and 5481 Kiuchi are in fact binary asteroids. In 1999, he discovered the Eunomian main-belt asteroid 24260 Kriváň, which he named after one Slovakia's national symbols, as well as 21656 Knuth and 20256 Adolfneckař, both located in the constellation Aquarius at the time. He is based out of numerous observatories in the Czech Republic, including the Ondřejov Observatory, and works solo or with partners.

The Flora asteroid 17260 Kušnirák, discovered by the U.S. LINEAR project at Lincoln Lab's ETS in 2000, is named in his honor (M.P.C. 10060).

== List of discovered minor planets ==
(16099) 1999 VQ_{24}^{[A]}	November 15, 1999
18182 Wiener^{[A]}	August 27, 2000
18838 Shannon^{[B]}	July 18, 1999
20495 Rimavská Sobota^{[A]}	August 15, 1999
21656 Knuth^{[A]}	August 9, 1999
22185 Štiavnica^{[C]}	December 29, 2000
22824 von Neumann^{[A]}	September 12, 1999
22901 Ivanbella^{[A]}	October 12, 1999
24260 Kriváň	December 13, 1999
(24323) 2000 AW_{49}^{[A]}	January 5, 2000
25384 Partizánske	October 18, 1999
25778 Csere	February 4, 2000
25864 Banič	April 8, 2000
26390 Rušin	October 19, 1999
26401 Sobotište	November 19, 1999
26639 Murgaš	May 5, 2000
26640 Bahýľ	May 9, 2000
26661 Kempelen	November 27, 2000
27525 Vartovka^{[A]}	April 29, 2000
28878 Segner	May 26, 2000
30253 Vítek^{[A]}	April 30, 2000
30252 Textorisová	April 30, 2000
(30398) 2000 KM_{41}	May 30, 2000
32294 Zajonc^{[A]}	August 26, 2000
32531 Ulrikababiaková	August 13, 2001
34753 Zdeněkmatyáš^{[A]}	August 24, 2001
36060 Babuška^{[A]}	September 14, 1999
(36280) 2000 CJ_{77}	February 1, 2000
(36339) 2000 NF_{10}	July 7, 2000
(36471) 2000 QK_{26}^{[A]}	August 27, 2000
36888 Škrabal^{[A]}	September 29, 2000
37279 Hukvaldy^{[A]}	December 22, 2000
38684 Velehrad^{[A]}	October 25, 2000
(38685) 2000 QP_{9}^{[A]}	August 26, 2000
(39221) 2000 YK_{8}^{[A]}	December 20, 2000
(39228) 2000 YX_{28}	December 29, 2000
40440 Dobrovský^{[A]}	September 11, 1999
40441 Jungmann^{[A]}	September 11, 1999
40459 Rektorys^{[A]}	September 14, 1999
40763 Zloch	October 5, 1999
(42838) 1999 PP_{3}^{[A]}	August 13, 1999
42998 Malinafrank^{[A]}	October 17, 1999
(43085) 1999 WE_{2}	November 19, 1999
(43237) 2000 AB_{204}	January 6, 2000
44613 Rudolf^{[A]}	September 8, 1999
(44616) 1999 RT_{34}^{[A]}	September 10, 1999
(44728) 1999 TT_{15}^{[A]}	October 13, 1999
(44908) 1999 VR_{24}	November 15, 1999
(45015) 1999 WQ	November 16, 1999

(45760) 2000 KY_{43}	May 30, 2000
46280 Hollar^{[A]}	May 21, 2001
48171 Juza^{[A]}	April 23, 2001
(48243) 2001 PE_{7}	August 11, 2001
51895 Biblialexa^{[A]}	August 19, 2001
(55083) 2001 QV_{110}^{[A]}	August 24, 2001
(55603) 2002 RE_{117}^{[A]}	September 7, 2002
(56713) 2000 MC_{3}	June 30, 2000
59800 Astropis^{[A]}	August 14, 1999
(60007) 1999 TO_{16}^{[A]}	October 13, 1999
(60148) 1999 US_{1}^{[A]}	October 16, 1999
60150 Zacharias^{[A]}	October 19, 1999
(61135) 2000 NT_{2}^{[A]}	July 5, 2000
61404 Očenášek^{[A]}	August 26, 2000
(61645) 2000 QT_{109}^{[A]}	August 27, 2000
62794 Scheirich^{[A]}	October 30, 2000
63162 Davidčapek^{[A]}	December 22, 2000
(63584) 2001 QY_{33}^{[A]}	August 19, 2001
(63655) 2001 QV_{113}^{[A]}	August 26, 2001
(63686) 2001 QY_{152}	August 26, 2001
(63895) 2001 SZ_{5}	September 18, 2001
(65211) 2002 EK_{1}	March 6, 2002
(66486) 1999 RF_{42}^{[A]}	September 14, 1999
(67411) 2000 QJ_{26}^{[A]}	August 26, 2000
(68539) 2001 WL_{2}	November 17, 2001
(70216) 1999 RH_{42}^{[A]}	September 14, 1999
(70448) 1999 TS_{15}^{[B]}	October 7, 1999
(71087) 1999 XV_{127}	December 13, 1999
(71507) 2000 CP_{34}	February 4, 2000
(71783) 2000 SL_{163}^{[A]}	September 30, 2000
(72062) 2000 YR_{17}^{[C]}	December 24, 2000
(72070) 2000 YC_{33}^{[C]}	December 31, 2000
(72518) 2001 DP_{86}	February 25, 2001
(72886) 2001 KC_{18}^{[A]}	May 21, 2001
(72914) 2001 PS_{14}	August 14, 2001
74764 Rudolfpešek^{[A]}	September 15, 1999
75009 Petervereš^{[A]}	October 16, 1999
(75437) 1999 XN_{127}	December 6, 1999
(77593) 2001 KJ_{20}^{[A]}	May 22, 2001
77621 Koten^{[A]}	May 25, 2001
78536 Shrbený^{[A]}	September 7, 2002
(78540) 2002 RH_{117}^{[A]}	September 7, 2002
(78542) 2002 RH_{119}^{[A]}	September 9, 2002
(82365) 2001 MP_{8}	June 25, 2001
(82653) 2001 PF_{13}	August 13, 2001
(82809) 2001 QK_{33}^{[C]}	August 17, 2001
(82908) 2001 QU_{100}^{[C]}	August 19, 2001
(82928) 2001 QM_{110}^{[A]}	August 19, 2001
(82929) 2001 QN_{110}^{[A]}	August 20, 2001
(82930) 2001 QZ_{110}^{[A]}	August 24, 2001

82937 Lesicki^{[A]}	August 26, 2001
(86048) 1999 PP_{1}^{[A]}	August 9, 1999
87088 Joannewheeler^{[A]}	June 2, 2000
89282 Suzieimber^{[A]}	November 10, 2001
(89350) 2001 VM_{71}^{[A]}	November 11, 2001
(91427) 1999 PB_{5}^{[A]}	August 14, 1999
(91452) 1999 RL_{43}^{[A]}	September 14, 1999
(91600) 1999 TN_{16}^{[A]}	October 13, 1999
(91844) 1999 UR_{2}^{[A]}	October 19, 1999
92389 Gretskij^{[A]}	May 3, 2000
(93255) 2000 SC_{163}^{[A]}	September 29, 2000
(93256) 2000 SD_{163}^{[A]}	September 29, 2000
(93524) 2000 UQ	October 20, 2000
94556 Janstarý^{[A]}	November 11, 2001
(94596) 2001 VW_{71}^{[A]}	November 14, 2001
(96765) 1999 RS_{34}^{[A]}	September 10, 1999
(97786) 2000 NU_{2}^{[A]}	July 5, 2000
(99507) 2002 EL_{1}	March 6, 2002
(99921) 1999 RO_{190}^{[A]}	September 15, 1999
(102228) 1999 TG_{15}^{[A]}	October 12, 1998
(102229) 1999 TS_{17}^{[A]}	October 15, 1998
(103016) 1999 XH_{105}^{[A]}	December 8, 1999
(104650) 2000 GY_{132}^{[C]}	April 9, 2000
(105280) 2000 QD_{35}	August 28, 2000
(106195) 2000 UM_{15}	October 29, 2000
107054 Daniela	January 1, 2001
(107555) 2001 DH_{80}^{[A]}	February 19, 2001
(108378) 2001 KK_{20}^{[A]}	May 22, 2001
(109096) 2001 QJ_{33}^{[C]}	August 16, 2001
(109266) 2001 QL_{110}	August 19, 2001
(109354) 2001 QU_{153}^{[A]}	August 26, 2001
(109777) 2001 RY_{81}	September 14, 2001
(113210) 2002 RF_{117}^{[A]}	September 7, 2002
(118683) 2000 NE_{11}	July 12, 2000
(118777) 2000 RW_{59}	September 7, 2000
(118828) 2000 SF_{163}^{[A]}	September 29, 2000
(118829) 2000 SJ_{163}^{[A]}	September 30, 2000
(118993) 2000 YL_{12}^{[A]}	December 22, 2000
(119983) 2002 XB_{39}^{[A]}	December 7, 2002
(121339) 1999 TO_{15}^{[A]}	October 13, 1999
(122311) 2000 QL_{9}^{[A]}	August 25, 2000
(122337) 2000 QA_{35}^{[A]}	August 27, 2000
(123189) 2000 UP_{13}	October 23, 2000
(123606) 2000 YF_{11}^{[A]}	December 22, 2000
(123613) 2000 YQ_{17}^{[C]}	December 24, 2000
123647 Tomáško^{[C]}	December 31, 2000
(124087) 2001 HY_{15}^{[A]}	April 23, 2001
(125371) 2001 VV_{71}^{[A]}	November 14, 2001
(129847) 1999 RH_{40}^{[A]}	September 13, 1999
(129887) 1999 TT_{17}^{[A]}	October 15, 1999

(130433) 2000 QO_{9}^{[A]}	August 26, 2000
(130872) 2000 VQ_{2}	November 1, 2000
(130873) 2000 VR_{2}^{[A]}	November 1, 2000
(131358) 2001 KA_{2}^{[A]}	May 19, 2001
(131548) 2001 VF_{17}^{[A]}	November 11, 2001
(132159) 2002 EP_{2}^{[A]}	March 8, 2002
(134528) 1999 RQ_{38}^{[A]}	September 12, 1999
(134697) 1999 XG_{105}^{[A]}	December 8, 1999
(135337) 2001 TE_{14}^{[A]}	October 13, 2001
(135756) 2002 RN^{[A]}	September 2, 2002
(137314) 1999 TQ_{14}	October 12, 1999
(137974) 2000 CG_{41}	February 7, 2000
(139233) 2001 HT_{18}^{[A]}	April 25, 2001
(139290) 2001 KC_{2}^{[A]}	May 20, 2001
(139485) 2001 PT_{14}	August 14, 2001
(139586) 2001 QS_{110}^{[A]}	August 24, 2001
(139591) 2001 QS_{113}^{[A]}	August 25, 2001
(140873) 2001 VH_{17}^{[A]}	November 11, 2001
(142110) 2002 RO^{[A]}	September 2, 2002
(142154) 2002 RM_{28}^{[A]}	September 5, 2002
(143139) 2002 XC_{39}^{[A]}	December 7, 2002
(145910) 1999 UB^{[A]}	October 16, 1999
(146397) 2001 QW_{153}	August 27, 2001
(148865) 2001 VF_{76}^{[A]}	November 15, 2001
(148884) 2001 WO_{14}^{[A]}	November 20, 2001
(150309) 1999 US_{2}^{[A]}	October 19, 1999
(150636) 2001 BR_{50}^{[A]}	January 27, 2001
(150698) 2001 PG_{7}	August 11, 2001
(150744) 2001 QE_{94}^{[A]}	August 20, 2001
(150745) 2001 QU_{113}^{[A]}	August 26, 2001
(152875) 2000 AX_{49}^{[A]}	January 5, 2000
(153104) 2000 SG_{42}	September 26, 2000
(153485) 2001 RZ_{81}	September 14, 2001
(153616) 2001 TD_{17}^{[A]}	October 14, 2001
(154096) 2002 DE^{[A]}	February 16, 2002
(156548) 2002 EM_{1}	March 6, 2002
(157993) 2000 LP_{8}^{[A]}	June 3, 2000
(158010) 2000 QU_{109}	August 28, 2000
(162496) 2000 QH_{26}^{[A]}	August 26, 2000
(162699) 2000 US_{30}^{[A]}	October 29, 2000
(165655) 2001 KB_{2}^{[A]}	May 19, 2001
(165712) 2001 QV_{33}^{[C]}	August 17, 2001
(166526) 2002 RK^{[A]}	September 2, 2002
(166537) 2002 RO_{27}	September 4, 2002
167208 Lelekovice^{[D]}	October 17, 2003
(168504) 1999 TL_{15}^{[A]}	October 12, 1999
(168842) 2000 UP	October 20, 2000
(171809) 2001 DO_{86}	February 25, 2001
(171868) 2001 QR_{110}^{[A]}	August 24, 2001
(173575) 2001 BS_{50}^{[A]}	January 27, 2001

(173718) 2001 QA_{153}	August 27, 2001
(173909) 2001 VC_{17}^{[A]}	November 10, 2001
(176346) 2001 TC_{17}^{[A]}	October 14, 2001
(178535) 1999 UA^{[A]}	October 16, 1999
(178834) 2001 HA_{16}^{[A]}	April 24, 2001
(181909) 1999 TX_{15}^{[A]}	October 12, 1999
(182278) 2001 KG_{18}^{[A]}	May 20, 2001
(183582) 2003 SM_{127}	September 19, 2003
185757 Kareltrutnovský^{[A]}	October 12, 1999
(185976) 2001 KY_{41}^{[A]}	May 24, 2001
(193266) 2000 SN_{163}^{[A]}	September 30, 2000
(193498) 2000 YS_{17}	December 25, 2000
(194429) 2001 VR_{71}^{[A]}	November 10, 2001
(195577) 2002 JU_{99}	May 12, 2002
(200479) 2000 YO_{12}^{[A]}	December 22, 2000
(200556) 2001 KA_{42}^{[A]}	May 25, 2001
(202964) 1999 TH_{15}^{[A]}	October 12, 1999
(203257) 2001 QC_{153}	August 27, 2001
(204013) 2003 UU_{38}	October 27, 2003
(205082) 1999 TM_{15}^{[A]}	October 12, 1999
(205469) 2001 QY_{113}^{[A]}	August 26, 2001
(208035) 1999 RV_{34}^{[A]}	September 11, 1999
(208811) 2002 RQ	September 3, 2002
(210661) 2000 QG_{26}^{[A]}	August 26, 2000
(213059) 1999 RG_{42}^{[A]}	September 14, 1999
(213246) 2001 BP_{50}^{[A]}	January 26, 2001
(216940) 1999 TM_{16}^{[A]}	October 13, 1999
(217833) 2001 KC_{33}^{[A]}	May 23, 2001
(217868) 2001 QT_{153}	August 26, 2001
(219205) 1999 VO_{40}^{[A]}	November 15, 1999
(222828) 2002 ER_{2}	March 9, 2002
(225545) 2000 SO_{163}^{[A]}	September 30, 2000
(231883) 2000 VS_{2}^{[A]}	November 2, 2000
(234386) 2001 QR_{113}^{[A]}	August 25, 2001
(237434) 1999 PH_{3}^{[A]}	August 10, 1999
(237540) 2000 UN	October 20, 2000
(241657) 2000 JC_{7}^{[A]}	May 6, 2000
(241787) 2001 PE_{13}	August 12, 2001
(241795) 2001 QQ_{110}	August 24, 2001
(247051) 2000 LZ^{[A]}	June 2, 2000
(249929) 2001 TD_{14}^{[A]}	October 12, 2001
(250719) 2005 SN_{21}	September 23, 2005
(252258) 2001 QB_{153}	August 27, 2001
(252743) 2002 EJ_{1}	March 6, 2002
(257844) 2000 KQ_{44}^{[A]}	May 31, 2000
(257871) 2000 SX_{44}	September 26, 2000
(257945) 2000 YC_{12}	December 22, 2000
(258632) 2002 ES_{8}	March 11, 2002
(269953) 2000 SH_{163}^{[A]}	September 30, 2000
(270067) 2001 PU_{14}	August 14, 2001

(270477) 2002 EK_{5}^{[A]}	March 8, 2002
(276243) 2002 RG_{117}^{[A]}	September 7, 2002
(277262) 2005 SB_{26}	September 28, 2005
(279817) 2000 JA_{7}	May 3, 2000
(279967) 2001 TA_{14}	October 12, 2001
(282631) 2005 SV_{1}	September 23, 2005
(283511) 2001 TZ_{13}	October 12, 2001
(285687) 2000 SM_{163}^{[A]}	September 30, 2000
(285802) 2000 YJ_{12}^{[A]}	December 22, 2000
(286083) 2001 TB_{17}^{[A]}	October 14, 2001
(297383) 2000 QO_{1}^{[A]}	August 23, 2000
301949 Hambalek	February 3, 2000
(306480) 1999 TR_{14}	October 5, 1999
(306752) 2000 YN_{12}^{[A]}	December 22, 2000
(306977) 2001 VB_{82}^{[A]}	November 15, 2001
(310536) 2001 BT_{50}	January 27, 2001
(313192) 2001 QT_{113}^{[A]}	August 25, 2001
(317156) 2001 VT_{71}	November 13, 2001
(317456) 2002 RP	September 2, 2002
(322731) 2000 SK_{163}^{[A]}	September 30, 2000
(326775) 2003 SW2_{15}	September 25, 2003
(334076) 2001 QW_{33}^{[C]}	August 17, 2001
(334084) 2001 QO_{110}^{[A]}	August 20, 2001
(337384) 2001 QY_{110}^{[A]}	August 24, 2001
(337608) 2001 TB_{14}	October 12, 2001
(337837) 2001 VS_{71}	November 11, 2001
(344191) 2001 KB_{18}^{[A]}	May 20, 2001
(344428) 2002 DD^{[A]}	February 16, 2002
(357050) 2000 UJ_{13}	October 22, 2000
(360461) 2002 RL^{[A]}	September 2, 2002
(370201) 2002 EU_{7}	March 11, 2002
(373611) 2002 EQ_{2}^{[A]}	March 8, 2002
(373695) 2002 RJ_{117}^{[A]}	September 8, 2002
(377015) 2002 RP_{27}	September 4, 2002
(382496) 2001 QX_{110}^{[A]}	August 24, 2001
(385259) 2001 PP_{9}	August 12, 2001
(393414) 2001 QT_{110}^{[A]}	August 24, 2001
(422700) 2000 QB_{35}^{[A]}	August 27, 2000
Legend of co-discoverers:^{A} with P. Pravec^{B} with L. Šarounová^{C} with U. Babiaková^{D} with K. Hornoch
