= List of minor planets: 124001–125000 =

The following is a partial list of minor planets, running from minor-planet number 124001 through 125000, inclusive. The primary data for this and other partial lists is based on JPL's "Small-Body Orbital Elements" and data available from the Minor Planet Center. Critical list information is also provided by the MPC, unless otherwise specified from Lowell Observatory. A detailed description of the table's columns and additional sources are given on the main page including a complete list of every page in this series, and a statistical break-up on the dynamical classification of minor planets.

Also see the summary list of all named bodies in numerical and alphabetical order, and the corresponding naming citations for the number range of this particular list. New namings may only be added to this list after official publication, as the preannouncement of names is condemned by the Working Group for Small Bodies Nomenclature of the International Astronomical Union.

Near-Earth obj.	MBA (inner)	MBA (outer)	Centaur
Mars-crosser	MBA (middle)	Jupiter trojan	Trans-Neptunian obj.
Unclassified

== 124001–124100 ==
Designation			Discovery			Properties		Ref
Permanent	Provisional	Named after	Date	Site	Discoverer(s)	Category	Diam.	Ref
124001	2001 FB_{77}	—	March 19, 2001	Socorro	LINEAR	·	5.9 km	MPC · JPL
124002	2001 FX_{77}	—	March 19, 2001	Socorro	LINEAR	EOS	4.9 km	MPC · JPL
124003	2001 FP_{79}	—	March 21, 2001	Socorro	LINEAR	·	6.6 km	MPC · JPL
124004	2001 FG_{81}	—	March 23, 2001	Socorro	LINEAR	·	7.7 km	MPC · JPL
124005	2001 FK_{81}	—	March 23, 2001	Socorro	LINEAR	·	4.7 km	MPC · JPL
124006	2001 FT_{86}	—	March 21, 2001	Anderson Mesa	LONEOS	·	4.8 km	MPC · JPL
124007	2001 FQ_{88}	—	March 26, 2001	Kitt Peak	Spacewatch	THM	3.1 km	MPC · JPL
124008	2001 FR_{90}	—	March 26, 2001	Socorro	LINEAR	THM	5.7 km	MPC · JPL
124009	2001 FS_{91}	—	March 16, 2001	Kitt Peak	Spacewatch	·	5.9 km	MPC · JPL
124010	2001 FT_{91}	—	March 16, 2001	Socorro	LINEAR	HYG	6.8 km	MPC · JPL
124011	2001 FK_{94}	—	March 16, 2001	Socorro	LINEAR	·	6.0 km	MPC · JPL
124012	2001 FK_{96}	—	March 16, 2001	Socorro	LINEAR	EOS	5.2 km	MPC · JPL
124013	2001 FK_{101}	—	March 17, 2001	Socorro	LINEAR	·	6.9 km	MPC · JPL
124014	2001 FS_{101}	—	March 17, 2001	Socorro	LINEAR	EMA	7.9 km	MPC · JPL
124015	2001 FE_{102}	—	March 17, 2001	Socorro	LINEAR	·	7.8 km	MPC · JPL
124016	2001 FJ_{103}	—	March 18, 2001	Socorro	LINEAR	THM	4.3 km	MPC · JPL
124017	2001 FP_{105}	—	March 18, 2001	Socorro	LINEAR	KOR	3.1 km	MPC · JPL
124018	2001 FU_{106}	—	March 18, 2001	Anderson Mesa	LONEOS	KOR	3.1 km	MPC · JPL
124019	2001 FT_{107}	—	March 18, 2001	Haleakala	NEAT	·	4.7 km	MPC · JPL
124020	2001 FP_{109}	—	March 18, 2001	Socorro	LINEAR	·	4.8 km	MPC · JPL
124021	2001 FT_{110}	—	March 18, 2001	Socorro	LINEAR	THM	6.9 km	MPC · JPL
124022	2001 FU_{110}	—	March 18, 2001	Socorro	LINEAR	·	5.3 km	MPC · JPL
124023	2001 FK_{112}	—	March 18, 2001	Haleakala	NEAT	·	4.7 km	MPC · JPL
124024	2001 FO_{112}	—	March 18, 2001	Haleakala	NEAT	EOS	3.7 km	MPC · JPL
124025	2001 FV_{114}	—	March 19, 2001	Anderson Mesa	LONEOS	EOS	4.0 km	MPC · JPL
124026	2001 FZ_{115}	—	March 19, 2001	Anderson Mesa	LONEOS	·	5.3 km	MPC · JPL
124027	2001 FS_{117}	—	March 19, 2001	Haleakala	NEAT	THB	6.5 km	MPC · JPL
124028	2001 FB_{119}	—	March 20, 2001	Haleakala	NEAT	·	3.4 km	MPC · JPL
124029	2001 FG_{121}	—	March 26, 2001	Socorro	LINEAR	EOS	3.4 km	MPC · JPL
124030	2001 FN_{121}	—	March 23, 2001	Haleakala	NEAT	·	4.3 km	MPC · JPL
124031	2001 FC_{124}	—	March 23, 2001	Anderson Mesa	LONEOS	TIR	5.4 km	MPC · JPL
124032	2001 FN_{126}	—	March 26, 2001	Socorro	LINEAR	slow	8.5 km	MPC · JPL
124033	2001 FP_{127}	—	March 29, 2001	Bagnall Beach	Crawford, G.	·	5.8 km	MPC · JPL
124034	2001 FX_{129}	—	March 29, 2001	Socorro	LINEAR	·	4.1 km	MPC · JPL
124035	2001 FK_{131}	—	March 20, 2001	Haleakala	NEAT	·	6.0 km	MPC · JPL
124036	2001 FZ_{132}	—	March 20, 2001	Haleakala	NEAT	·	7.3 km	MPC · JPL
124037	2001 FU_{133}	—	March 20, 2001	Haleakala	NEAT	HYG	5.5 km	MPC · JPL
124038	2001 FN_{134}	—	March 20, 2001	Haleakala	NEAT	·	5.3 km	MPC · JPL
124039	2001 FE_{135}	—	March 21, 2001	Anderson Mesa	LONEOS	·	8.2 km	MPC · JPL
124040	2001 FX_{137}	—	March 21, 2001	Anderson Mesa	LONEOS	·	8.8 km	MPC · JPL
124041	2001 FU_{138}	—	March 21, 2001	Haleakala	NEAT	·	7.9 km	MPC · JPL
124042	2001 FF_{140}	—	March 21, 2001	Haleakala	NEAT	THM	3.7 km	MPC · JPL
124043	2001 FH_{140}	—	March 21, 2001	Haleakala	NEAT	·	4.1 km	MPC · JPL
124044	2001 FB_{141}	—	March 23, 2001	Anderson Mesa	LONEOS	CLO	5.7 km	MPC · JPL
124045	2001 FL_{141}	—	March 23, 2001	Anderson Mesa	LONEOS	·	5.3 km	MPC · JPL
124046	2001 FP_{141}	—	March 23, 2001	Anderson Mesa	LONEOS	·	5.9 km	MPC · JPL
124047	2001 FP_{143}	—	March 23, 2001	Anderson Mesa	LONEOS	·	6.9 km	MPC · JPL
124048	2001 FH_{146}	—	March 24, 2001	Anderson Mesa	LONEOS	·	6.1 km	MPC · JPL
124049	2001 FJ_{146}	—	March 24, 2001	Anderson Mesa	LONEOS	·	5.6 km	MPC · JPL
124050	2001 FJ_{148}	—	March 24, 2001	Anderson Mesa	LONEOS	·	7.0 km	MPC · JPL
124051	2001 FU_{150}	—	March 24, 2001	Anderson Mesa	LONEOS	EOS	4.3 km	MPC · JPL
124052	2001 FM_{152}	—	March 26, 2001	Socorro	LINEAR	·	4.9 km	MPC · JPL
124053	2001 FM_{153}	—	March 26, 2001	Socorro	LINEAR	·	5.0 km	MPC · JPL
124054	2001 FO_{155}	—	March 26, 2001	Haleakala	NEAT	EOS	4.6 km	MPC · JPL
124055	2001 FJ_{160}	—	March 29, 2001	Haleakala	NEAT	·	8.2 km	MPC · JPL
124056	2001 FW_{160}	—	March 29, 2001	Haleakala	NEAT	·	6.0 km	MPC · JPL
124057	2001 FH_{162}	—	March 30, 2001	Haleakala	NEAT	·	5.2 km	MPC · JPL
124058	2001 FH_{164}	—	March 18, 2001	Socorro	LINEAR	·	5.0 km	MPC · JPL
124059	2001 FL_{166}	—	March 19, 2001	Anderson Mesa	LONEOS	·	7.5 km	MPC · JPL
124060	2001 FZ_{167}	—	March 20, 2001	Kitt Peak	Spacewatch	·	3.0 km	MPC · JPL
124061	2001 FW_{168}	—	March 23, 2001	Socorro	LINEAR	·	3.5 km	MPC · JPL
124062	2001 FG_{169}	—	March 23, 2001	Anderson Mesa	LONEOS	THB	6.5 km	MPC · JPL
124063	2001 FL_{171}	—	March 24, 2001	Socorro	LINEAR	·	7.4 km	MPC · JPL
124064	2001 FQ_{171}	—	March 24, 2001	Haleakala	NEAT	TIR	6.1 km	MPC · JPL
124065	2001 FO_{172}	—	March 25, 2001	Anderson Mesa	LONEOS	·	4.7 km	MPC · JPL
124066	2001 FG_{175}	—	March 31, 2001	Socorro	LINEAR	·	9.6 km	MPC · JPL
124067	2001 FK_{175}	—	March 31, 2001	Socorro	LINEAR	TIR	6.7 km	MPC · JPL
124068	2001 FX_{175}	—	March 16, 2001	Socorro	LINEAR	·	4.6 km	MPC · JPL
124069	2001 FY_{176}	—	March 16, 2001	Socorro	LINEAR	·	6.2 km	MPC · JPL
124070	2001 FZ_{176}	—	March 16, 2001	Socorro	LINEAR	·	9.4 km	MPC · JPL
124071	2001 FW_{192}	—	March 26, 2001	Haleakala	NEAT	VER	5.8 km	MPC · JPL
124072	2001 FG_{194}	—	March 24, 2001	Anderson Mesa	LONEOS	·	9.0 km	MPC · JPL
124073	2001 GJ_{1}	—	April 13, 2001	Socorro	LINEAR	·	7.8 km	MPC · JPL
124074	2001 GR_{1}	—	April 15, 2001	Kanab	Sheridan, E. E.	·	5.1 km	MPC · JPL
124075 Ketelsen	2001 GT_{1}	Ketelsen	April 15, 2001	Junk Bond	D. Healy	·	3.5 km	MPC · JPL
124076	2001 GG_{3}	—	April 14, 2001	Socorro	LINEAR	H	1.3 km	MPC · JPL
124077	2001 GJ_{3}	—	April 14, 2001	Socorro	LINEAR	H	1.2 km	MPC · JPL
124078	2001 GM_{3}	—	April 14, 2001	Socorro	LINEAR	H	1.3 km	MPC · JPL
124079	2001 GQ_{3}	—	April 14, 2001	Socorro	LINEAR	EUP	6.6 km	MPC · JPL
124080	2001 GO_{4}	—	April 14, 2001	Socorro	LINEAR	H	1.5 km	MPC · JPL
124081	2001 GY_{4}	—	April 15, 2001	Socorro	LINEAR	·	6.5 km	MPC · JPL
124082	2001 GV_{6}	—	April 15, 2001	Socorro	LINEAR	·	8.1 km	MPC · JPL
124083	2001 GC_{11}	—	April 15, 2001	Haleakala	NEAT	·	2.9 km	MPC · JPL
124084	2001 HP_{7}	—	April 17, 2001	Desert Beaver	W. K. Y. Yeung	THM	4.9 km	MPC · JPL
124085	2001 HR_{8}	—	April 21, 2001	Socorro	LINEAR	H	1.3 km	MPC · JPL
124086	2001 HZ_{11}	—	April 18, 2001	Socorro	LINEAR	·	5.6 km	MPC · JPL
124087	2001 HY_{15}	—	April 23, 2001	Ondřejov	P. Kušnirák, P. Pravec	HYG	5.6 km	MPC · JPL
124088	2001 HP_{16}	—	April 24, 2001	Anderson Mesa	LONEOS	H	960 m	MPC · JPL
124089	2001 HZ_{19}	—	April 21, 2001	Socorro	LINEAR	EUP	7.9 km	MPC · JPL
124090	2001 HZ_{24}	—	April 23, 2001	Kitt Peak	Spacewatch	·	4.3 km	MPC · JPL
124091	2001 HD_{27}	—	April 27, 2001	Desert Beaver	W. K. Y. Yeung	·	9.4 km	MPC · JPL
124092	2001 HJ_{32}	—	April 23, 2001	Socorro	LINEAR	·	5.6 km	MPC · JPL
124093	2001 HB_{33}	—	April 27, 2001	Socorro	LINEAR	·	6.8 km	MPC · JPL
124094	2001 HK_{33}	—	April 27, 2001	Socorro	LINEAR	·	5.5 km	MPC · JPL
124095	2001 HL_{33}	—	April 27, 2001	Socorro	LINEAR	THM	4.6 km	MPC · JPL
124096	2001 HT_{40}	—	April 27, 2001	Socorro	LINEAR	·	7.2 km	MPC · JPL
124097	2001 HZ_{40}	—	April 27, 2001	Socorro	LINEAR	LUT	10 km	MPC · JPL
124098	2001 HE_{41}	—	April 27, 2001	Socorro	LINEAR	·	6.6 km	MPC · JPL
124099	2001 HG_{41}	—	April 27, 2001	Socorro	LINEAR	·	6.0 km	MPC · JPL
124100	2001 HS_{41}	—	April 30, 2001	Kitt Peak	Spacewatch	T_{j} (2.98) · HIL · 3:2	10 km	MPC · JPL

== 124101–124200 ==
back to top

Designation			Discovery			Properties		Ref
Permanent	Provisional	Named after	Date	Site	Discoverer(s)	Category	Diam.	Ref
124101	2001 HX_{41}	—	April 16, 2001	Socorro	LINEAR	·	6.9 km	MPC · JPL
124102	2001 HG_{43}	—	April 16, 2001	Anderson Mesa	LONEOS	·	4.0 km	MPC · JPL
124103	2001 HO_{43}	—	April 16, 2001	Anderson Mesa	LONEOS	·	4.9 km	MPC · JPL
124104 Balcony	2001 HJ_{46}	Balcony	April 17, 2001	Saint-Véran	St. Veran	·	2.5 km	MPC · JPL
124105	2001 HN_{48}	—	April 21, 2001	Socorro	LINEAR	TIR	4.8 km	MPC · JPL
124106	2001 HH_{49}	—	April 21, 2001	Socorro	LINEAR	·	6.4 km	MPC · JPL
124107	2001 HX_{49}	—	April 21, 2001	Haleakala	NEAT	·	8.5 km	MPC · JPL
124108	2001 HD_{50}	—	April 21, 2001	Haleakala	NEAT	·	7.0 km	MPC · JPL
124109	2001 HK_{50}	—	April 22, 2001	Socorro	LINEAR	TIR	5.0 km	MPC · JPL
124110	2001 HK_{53}	—	April 23, 2001	Socorro	LINEAR	·	3.7 km	MPC · JPL
124111	2001 HQ_{53}	—	April 23, 2001	Socorro	LINEAR	·	5.4 km	MPC · JPL
124112	2001 HB_{54}	—	April 24, 2001	Anderson Mesa	LONEOS	H	840 m	MPC · JPL
124113	2001 HT_{54}	—	April 24, 2001	Socorro	LINEAR	·	1.9 km	MPC · JPL
124114 Bergersen	2001 HX_{65}	Bergersen	April 21, 2001	Goodricke-Pigott	R. A. Tucker	·	8.4 km	MPC · JPL
124115	2001 JH_{4}	—	May 15, 2001	Haleakala	NEAT	·	1.0 km	MPC · JPL
124116	2001 JS_{6}	—	May 14, 2001	Haleakala	NEAT	·	6.5 km	MPC · JPL
124117	2001 JX_{6}	—	May 15, 2001	Anderson Mesa	LONEOS	·	6.0 km	MPC · JPL
124118	2001 JK_{8}	—	May 15, 2001	Anderson Mesa	LONEOS	·	8.5 km	MPC · JPL
124119	2001 JU_{10}	—	May 15, 2001	Anderson Mesa	LONEOS	EMA	6.5 km	MPC · JPL
124120	2001 KR_{2}	—	May 18, 2001	Socorro	LINEAR	·	1.2 km	MPC · JPL
124121	2001 KV_{2}	—	May 18, 2001	Socorro	LINEAR	H	990 m	MPC · JPL
124122	2001 KY_{2}	—	May 21, 2001	Socorro	LINEAR	H	1.2 km	MPC · JPL
124123	2001 KE_{3}	—	May 17, 2001	Socorro	LINEAR	HYG	5.5 km	MPC · JPL
124124	2001 KC_{4}	—	May 17, 2001	Socorro	LINEAR	LIX	7.5 km	MPC · JPL
124125	2001 KB_{6}	—	May 17, 2001	Socorro	LINEAR	·	2.8 km	MPC · JPL
124126	2001 KE_{9}	—	May 18, 2001	Socorro	LINEAR	·	7.0 km	MPC · JPL
124127	2001 KP_{13}	—	May 18, 2001	Socorro	LINEAR	·	1.5 km	MPC · JPL
124128	2001 KZ_{15}	—	May 18, 2001	Socorro	LINEAR	·	6.4 km	MPC · JPL
124129	2001 KF_{21}	—	May 21, 2001	Anderson Mesa	LONEOS	HYG	4.5 km	MPC · JPL
124130	2001 KN_{45}	—	May 22, 2001	Socorro	LINEAR	·	2.1 km	MPC · JPL
124131	2001 KZ_{50}	—	May 21, 2001	Socorro	LINEAR	·	6.5 km	MPC · JPL
124132	2001 KK_{57}	—	May 24, 2001	Socorro	LINEAR	·	1.2 km	MPC · JPL
124133	2001 KX_{64}	—	May 22, 2001	Anderson Mesa	LONEOS	·	5.4 km	MPC · JPL
124134	2001 KA_{72}	—	May 24, 2001	Socorro	LINEAR	·	1.5 km	MPC · JPL
124135	2001 LS	—	June 14, 2001	Palomar	NEAT	·	2.5 km	MPC · JPL
124136	2001 LT_{2}	—	June 13, 2001	Socorro	LINEAR	·	1.3 km	MPC · JPL
124137	2001 LQ_{5}	—	June 15, 2001	Kitt Peak	Spacewatch	·	1.6 km	MPC · JPL
124138	2001 LE_{12}	—	June 15, 2001	Socorro	LINEAR	·	1.5 km	MPC · JPL
124139	2001 LL_{12}	—	June 15, 2001	Socorro	LINEAR	·	2.6 km	MPC · JPL
124140	2001 LT_{17}	—	June 3, 2001	Haleakala	NEAT	·	1.9 km	MPC · JPL
124141	2001 LL_{18}	—	June 14, 2001	Anderson Mesa	LONEOS	H	1.5 km	MPC · JPL
124142	2001 ME_{2}	—	June 18, 2001	Socorro	LINEAR	H	1.0 km	MPC · JPL
124143 Joséluiscorral	2001 ME_{5}	Joséluiscorral	June 21, 2001	Calar Alto	Calar Alto	·	1.7 km	MPC · JPL
124144	2001 MG_{11}	—	June 20, 2001	Haleakala	NEAT	·	3.2 km	MPC · JPL
124145	2001 MN_{11}	—	June 19, 2001	Haleakala	NEAT	·	3.3 km	MPC · JPL
124146	2001 MQ_{12}	—	June 22, 2001	Palomar	NEAT	·	1.2 km	MPC · JPL
124147	2001 MW_{13}	—	June 25, 2001	Palomar	NEAT	·	1.2 km	MPC · JPL
124148	2001 MU_{20}	—	June 25, 2001	Palomar	NEAT	·	1.2 km	MPC · JPL
124149	2001 MG_{22}	—	June 28, 2001	Haleakala	NEAT	·	1.5 km	MPC · JPL
124150	2001 NV_{3}	—	July 13, 2001	Palomar	NEAT	·	2.3 km	MPC · JPL
124151	2001 NX_{4}	—	July 13, 2001	Palomar	NEAT	·	1.4 km	MPC · JPL
124152	2001 NX_{6}	—	July 14, 2001	Palomar	NEAT	·	2.2 km	MPC · JPL
124153	2001 NT_{7}	—	July 13, 2001	Palomar	NEAT	·	1.2 km	MPC · JPL
124154	2001 NA_{9}	—	July 12, 2001	Palomar	NEAT	·	5.2 km	MPC · JPL
124155	2001 NU_{19}	—	July 12, 2001	Haleakala	NEAT	·	1.3 km	MPC · JPL
124156	2001 NJ_{21}	—	July 14, 2001	Palomar	NEAT	·	2.0 km	MPC · JPL
124157	2001 NE_{22}	—	July 14, 2001	Palomar	NEAT	·	2.7 km	MPC · JPL
124158	2001 OV_{2}	—	July 17, 2001	Anderson Mesa	LONEOS	·	1.7 km	MPC · JPL
124159	2001 OB_{4}	—	July 18, 2001	Palomar	NEAT	·	1.8 km	MPC · JPL
124160	2001 OD_{7}	—	July 17, 2001	Anderson Mesa	LONEOS	·	2.2 km	MPC · JPL
124161	2001 OK_{12}	—	July 20, 2001	Palomar	NEAT	PHO	3.5 km	MPC · JPL
124162	2001 OQ_{13}	—	July 20, 2001	Socorro	LINEAR	·	1.2 km	MPC · JPL
124163	2001 OG_{14}	—	July 20, 2001	Socorro	LINEAR	·	2.1 km	MPC · JPL
124164	2001 OT_{15}	—	July 18, 2001	Palomar	NEAT	·	890 m	MPC · JPL
124165	2001 ON_{16}	—	July 21, 2001	Palomar	NEAT	·	1.9 km	MPC · JPL
124166	2001 OE_{18}	—	July 17, 2001	Haleakala	NEAT	·	1.3 km	MPC · JPL
124167	2001 OM_{18}	—	July 17, 2001	Haleakala	NEAT	(2076)	1.4 km	MPC · JPL
124168	2001 OQ_{18}	—	July 17, 2001	Haleakala	NEAT	V	950 m	MPC · JPL
124169	2001 OD_{21}	—	July 21, 2001	Anderson Mesa	LONEOS	NYS	2.3 km	MPC · JPL
124170	2001 OL_{21}	—	July 21, 2001	Anderson Mesa	LONEOS	·	2.1 km	MPC · JPL
124171	2001 OU_{21}	—	July 21, 2001	Anderson Mesa	LONEOS	·	2.3 km	MPC · JPL
124172	2001 OY_{23}	—	July 16, 2001	Anderson Mesa	LONEOS	·	1.5 km	MPC · JPL
124173	2001 OJ_{24}	—	July 16, 2001	Anderson Mesa	LONEOS	·	1.3 km	MPC · JPL
124174	2001 OR_{24}	—	July 16, 2001	Anderson Mesa	LONEOS	3:2 · SHU	9.8 km	MPC · JPL
124175	2001 OB_{26}	—	July 19, 2001	Haleakala	NEAT	·	1.5 km	MPC · JPL
124176	2001 OJ_{32}	—	July 24, 2001	Prescott	P. G. Comba	(2076)	1.6 km	MPC · JPL
124177	2001 OK_{37}	—	July 20, 2001	Palomar	NEAT	V	930 m	MPC · JPL
124178	2001 OJ_{40}	—	July 20, 2001	Palomar	NEAT	·	1.9 km	MPC · JPL
124179	2001 OY_{44}	—	July 16, 2001	Anderson Mesa	LONEOS	·	1.5 km	MPC · JPL
124180	2001 OY_{45}	—	July 16, 2001	Anderson Mesa	LONEOS	·	1.4 km	MPC · JPL
124181	2001 OD_{46}	—	July 16, 2001	Anderson Mesa	LONEOS	V	1.2 km	MPC · JPL
124182	2001 OJ_{50}	—	July 19, 2001	Haleakala	NEAT	·	1.2 km	MPC · JPL
124183	2001 OE_{52}	—	July 21, 2001	Palomar	NEAT	·	1.5 km	MPC · JPL
124184	2001 OT_{55}	—	July 22, 2001	Palomar	NEAT	(883)	1.7 km	MPC · JPL
124185	2001 OP_{56}	—	July 26, 2001	Palomar	NEAT	·	2.1 km	MPC · JPL
124186	2001 OH_{57}	—	July 16, 2001	Anderson Mesa	LONEOS	·	1.5 km	MPC · JPL
124187	2001 OL_{59}	—	July 21, 2001	Haleakala	NEAT	·	1.5 km	MPC · JPL
124188	2001 OM_{60}	—	July 21, 2001	Haleakala	NEAT	·	1.0 km	MPC · JPL
124189	2001 OS_{61}	—	July 21, 2001	Haleakala	NEAT	·	1.3 km	MPC · JPL
124190	2001 OC_{63}	—	July 27, 2001	Anderson Mesa	LONEOS	(1338) (FLO)	1.1 km	MPC · JPL
124191	2001 OO_{63}	—	July 19, 2001	Haleakala	NEAT	(883)	1.3 km	MPC · JPL
124192 Molėtai	2001 OM_{65}	Molėtai	July 26, 2001	Moletai	K. Černis, V. Laugalys	·	1.5 km	MPC · JPL
124193	2001 OS_{68}	—	July 16, 2001	Haleakala	NEAT	V	1.4 km	MPC · JPL
124194	2001 OY_{72}	—	July 21, 2001	Anderson Mesa	LONEOS	·	1.8 km	MPC · JPL
124195	2001 OZ_{72}	—	July 21, 2001	Anderson Mesa	LONEOS	·	1.9 km	MPC · JPL
124196	2001 OO_{73}	—	July 21, 2001	Kitt Peak	Spacewatch	V	1.3 km	MPC · JPL
124197	2001 OQ_{74}	—	July 29, 2001	Socorro	LINEAR	PHO	2.5 km	MPC · JPL
124198	2001 OH_{77}	—	July 18, 2001	Mauna Kea	D. J. Tholen	·	2.1 km	MPC · JPL
124199	2001 OV_{78}	—	July 26, 2001	Palomar	NEAT	·	2.5 km	MPC · JPL
124200	2001 OM_{81}	—	July 28, 2001	Anderson Mesa	LONEOS	·	3.6 km	MPC · JPL

== 124201–124300 ==
back to top

Designation			Discovery			Properties		Ref
Permanent	Provisional	Named after	Date	Site	Discoverer(s)	Category	Diam.	Ref
124201	2001 OJ_{85}	—	July 20, 2001	Anderson Mesa	LONEOS	·	1.4 km	MPC · JPL
124202	2001 OT_{85}	—	July 20, 2001	Socorro	LINEAR	·	1.7 km	MPC · JPL
124203	2001 OQ_{86}	—	July 28, 2001	Haleakala	NEAT	·	1.6 km	MPC · JPL
124204	2001 OP_{92}	—	July 22, 2001	Palomar	NEAT	·	1.3 km	MPC · JPL
124205	2001 OA_{94}	—	July 27, 2001	Anderson Mesa	LONEOS	·	1.3 km	MPC · JPL
124206	2001 OX_{95}	—	July 27, 2001	Bergisch Gladbach	W. Bickel	·	1.1 km	MPC · JPL
124207	2001 OK_{97}	—	July 25, 2001	Haleakala	NEAT	·	1.4 km	MPC · JPL
124208	2001 OR_{97}	—	July 25, 2001	Haleakala	NEAT	V	1.4 km	MPC · JPL
124209	2001 OM_{98}	—	July 25, 2001	Haleakala	NEAT	slow	1.3 km	MPC · JPL
124210	2001 OU_{100}	—	July 27, 2001	Anderson Mesa	LONEOS	·	1.4 km	MPC · JPL
124211	2001 OC_{101}	—	July 27, 2001	Haleakala	NEAT	·	1.6 km	MPC · JPL
124212	2001 OO_{102}	—	July 28, 2001	Haleakala	NEAT	·	1.2 km	MPC · JPL
124213	2001 OX_{106}	—	July 29, 2001	Socorro	LINEAR	·	1.4 km	MPC · JPL
124214	2001 OB_{111}	—	July 19, 2001	Palomar	NEAT	V	1.3 km	MPC · JPL
124215	2001 OJ_{111}	—	July 25, 2001	Haleakala	NEAT	·	1.5 km	MPC · JPL
124216	2001 PZ_{4}	—	August 7, 2001	Haleakala	NEAT	·	1.3 km	MPC · JPL
124217	2001 PV_{5}	—	August 10, 2001	Haleakala	NEAT	·	1.2 km	MPC · JPL
124218	2001 PY_{5}	—	August 10, 2001	Haleakala	NEAT	·	2.1 km	MPC · JPL
124219	2001 PN_{6}	—	August 10, 2001	Haleakala	NEAT	·	2.4 km	MPC · JPL
124220	2001 PQ_{6}	—	August 10, 2001	Haleakala	NEAT	MAS	1.1 km	MPC · JPL
124221	2001 PW_{9}	—	August 8, 2001	Haleakala	NEAT	·	1.5 km	MPC · JPL
124222	2001 PN_{10}	—	August 8, 2001	Haleakala	NEAT	·	1.5 km	MPC · JPL
124223	2001 PD_{13}	—	August 12, 2001	Palomar	NEAT	·	1.9 km	MPC · JPL
124224	2001 PF_{17}	—	August 9, 2001	Palomar	NEAT	CYB	9.1 km	MPC · JPL
124225	2001 PO_{20}	—	August 10, 2001	Palomar	NEAT	·	2.2 km	MPC · JPL
124226	2001 PK_{22}	—	August 10, 2001	Haleakala	NEAT	·	2.6 km	MPC · JPL
124227	2001 PV_{22}	—	August 10, 2001	Haleakala	NEAT	V	1.1 km	MPC · JPL
124228	2001 PT_{24}	—	August 11, 2001	Haleakala	NEAT	·	1.6 km	MPC · JPL
124229	2001 PX_{24}	—	August 11, 2001	Haleakala	NEAT	NYS	1.9 km	MPC · JPL
124230	2001 PH_{25}	—	August 11, 2001	Haleakala	NEAT	(1338) (FLO)	920 m	MPC · JPL
124231	2001 PJ_{25}	—	August 11, 2001	Haleakala	NEAT	·	1.7 km	MPC · JPL
124232	2001 PM_{26}	—	August 11, 2001	Haleakala	NEAT	NYS	1.8 km	MPC · JPL
124233	2001 PX_{36}	—	August 11, 2001	Palomar	NEAT	·	1.7 km	MPC · JPL
124234	2001 PP_{41}	—	August 11, 2001	Haleakala	NEAT	·	1.5 km	MPC · JPL
124235	2001 PB_{42}	—	August 11, 2001	Palomar	NEAT	V	1.5 km	MPC · JPL
124236	2001 PC_{44}	—	August 15, 2001	Haleakala	NEAT	·	1.7 km	MPC · JPL
124237	2001 PH_{45}	—	August 11, 2001	Haleakala	NEAT	·	1.7 km	MPC · JPL
124238	2001 PN_{45}	—	August 12, 2001	Palomar	NEAT	·	2.3 km	MPC · JPL
124239	2001 PO_{45}	—	August 12, 2001	Palomar	NEAT	·	2.0 km	MPC · JPL
124240	2001 PP_{48}	—	August 14, 2001	Palomar	NEAT	·	2.3 km	MPC · JPL
124241	2001 PS_{51}	—	August 15, 2001	Haleakala	NEAT	·	1.1 km	MPC · JPL
124242	2001 PP_{58}	—	August 14, 2001	Haleakala	NEAT	V	1.3 km	MPC · JPL
124243	2001 PS_{61}	—	August 13, 2001	Haleakala	NEAT	·	1.2 km	MPC · JPL
124244	2001 PD_{62}	—	August 13, 2001	Haleakala	NEAT	·	1.7 km	MPC · JPL
124245	2001 PS_{62}	—	August 13, 2001	Haleakala	NEAT	·	1.7 km	MPC · JPL
124246	2001 PW_{65}	—	August 15, 2001	Haleakala	NEAT	·	1.2 km	MPC · JPL
124247	2001 QV_{2}	—	August 16, 2001	Socorro	LINEAR	·	2.1 km	MPC · JPL
124248	2001 QB_{3}	—	August 16, 2001	Socorro	LINEAR	·	1.4 km	MPC · JPL
124249	2001 QD_{3}	—	August 16, 2001	Socorro	LINEAR	·	2.4 km	MPC · JPL
124250	2001 QG_{3}	—	August 16, 2001	Socorro	LINEAR	·	1.4 km	MPC · JPL
124251	2001 QV_{3}	—	August 16, 2001	Socorro	LINEAR	·	3.2 km	MPC · JPL
124252	2001 QA_{4}	—	August 16, 2001	Socorro	LINEAR	NYS	1.6 km	MPC · JPL
124253	2001 QH_{4}	—	August 16, 2001	Socorro	LINEAR	·	1.3 km	MPC · JPL
124254	2001 QA_{5}	—	August 16, 2001	Socorro	LINEAR	·	1.7 km	MPC · JPL
124255	2001 QY_{6}	—	August 16, 2001	Socorro	LINEAR	·	1.4 km	MPC · JPL
124256	2001 QG_{8}	—	August 16, 2001	Socorro	LINEAR	·	1.1 km	MPC · JPL
124257	2001 QB_{9}	—	August 16, 2001	Socorro	LINEAR	NYS	2.0 km	MPC · JPL
124258	2001 QT_{9}	—	August 16, 2001	Socorro	LINEAR	·	2.1 km	MPC · JPL
124259	2001 QM_{11}	—	August 16, 2001	Socorro	LINEAR	·	1.3 km	MPC · JPL
124260	2001 QK_{12}	—	August 16, 2001	Socorro	LINEAR	·	2.2 km	MPC · JPL
124261	2001 QP_{12}	—	August 16, 2001	Socorro	LINEAR	·	1.5 km	MPC · JPL
124262	2001 QU_{12}	—	August 16, 2001	Socorro	LINEAR	NYS	2.0 km	MPC · JPL
124263	2001 QN_{13}	—	August 16, 2001	Socorro	LINEAR	·	1.6 km	MPC · JPL
124264	2001 QL_{14}	—	August 16, 2001	Socorro	LINEAR	·	1.3 km	MPC · JPL
124265	2001 QZ_{14}	—	August 16, 2001	Socorro	LINEAR	MAS	1.2 km	MPC · JPL
124266	2001 QE_{15}	—	August 16, 2001	Socorro	LINEAR	·	1.3 km	MPC · JPL
124267	2001 QO_{15}	—	August 16, 2001	Socorro	LINEAR	·	1.5 km	MPC · JPL
124268	2001 QK_{16}	—	August 16, 2001	Socorro	LINEAR	·	1.7 km	MPC · JPL
124269	2001 QD_{18}	—	August 16, 2001	Socorro	LINEAR	T_{j} (2.99) · HIL · 3:2 · (6124)	10 km	MPC · JPL
124270	2001 QH_{19}	—	August 16, 2001	Socorro	LINEAR	NYS	2.6 km	MPC · JPL
124271	2001 QO_{19}	—	August 16, 2001	Socorro	LINEAR	·	4.0 km	MPC · JPL
124272	2001 QR_{19}	—	August 16, 2001	Socorro	LINEAR	MAS	1.2 km	MPC · JPL
124273	2001 QU_{19}	—	August 16, 2001	Socorro	LINEAR	NYS	1.8 km	MPC · JPL
124274	2001 QW_{20}	—	August 16, 2001	Socorro	LINEAR	·	1.4 km	MPC · JPL
124275	2001 QH_{23}	—	August 16, 2001	Socorro	LINEAR	·	1.5 km	MPC · JPL
124276	2001 QJ_{26}	—	August 16, 2001	Socorro	LINEAR	·	950 m	MPC · JPL
124277	2001 QX_{27}	—	August 16, 2001	Socorro	LINEAR	(2076)	1.8 km	MPC · JPL
124278	2001 QM_{28}	—	August 16, 2001	Socorro	LINEAR	·	2.0 km	MPC · JPL
124279	2001 QR_{28}	—	August 16, 2001	Socorro	LINEAR	·	2.4 km	MPC · JPL
124280	2001 QM_{29}	—	August 16, 2001	Socorro	LINEAR	·	2.6 km	MPC · JPL
124281	2001 QP_{32}	—	August 17, 2001	Palomar	NEAT	·	1.6 km	MPC · JPL
124282	2001 QA_{39}	—	August 16, 2001	Socorro	LINEAR	·	1.4 km	MPC · JPL
124283	2001 QC_{40}	—	August 16, 2001	Socorro	LINEAR	·	1 km	MPC · JPL
124284	2001 QQ_{42}	—	August 16, 2001	Socorro	LINEAR	MAS	1.2 km	MPC · JPL
124285	2001 QS_{43}	—	August 16, 2001	Socorro	LINEAR	·	1.1 km	MPC · JPL
124286	2001 QV_{43}	—	August 16, 2001	Socorro	LINEAR	·	1.3 km	MPC · JPL
124287	2001 QK_{45}	—	August 16, 2001	Socorro	LINEAR	·	1.4 km	MPC · JPL
124288	2001 QS_{48}	—	August 16, 2001	Socorro	LINEAR	NYS	2.1 km	MPC · JPL
124289	2001 QA_{51}	—	August 16, 2001	Socorro	LINEAR	·	1.5 km	MPC · JPL
124290	2001 QD_{51}	—	August 16, 2001	Socorro	LINEAR	·	1.3 km	MPC · JPL
124291	2001 QZ_{51}	—	August 16, 2001	Socorro	LINEAR	·	1.5 km	MPC · JPL
124292	2001 QE_{53}	—	August 16, 2001	Socorro	LINEAR	MAS	1.3 km	MPC · JPL
124293	2001 QQ_{53}	—	August 16, 2001	Socorro	LINEAR	·	1.4 km	MPC · JPL
124294	2001 QC_{55}	—	August 16, 2001	Socorro	LINEAR	·	1.3 km	MPC · JPL
124295	2001 QF_{56}	—	August 16, 2001	Socorro	LINEAR	·	2.4 km	MPC · JPL
124296	2001 QZ_{56}	—	August 16, 2001	Socorro	LINEAR	NYS	1.1 km	MPC · JPL
124297	2001 QE_{57}	—	August 16, 2001	Socorro	LINEAR	·	2.5 km	MPC · JPL
124298	2001 QQ_{57}	—	August 16, 2001	Socorro	LINEAR	·	1.3 km	MPC · JPL
124299	2001 QJ_{58}	—	August 16, 2001	Socorro	LINEAR	·	1.7 km	MPC · JPL
124300	2001 QN_{59}	—	August 18, 2001	Socorro	LINEAR	·	1.6 km	MPC · JPL

== 124301–124400 ==
back to top

Designation			Discovery			Properties		Ref
Permanent	Provisional	Named after	Date	Site	Discoverer(s)	Category	Diam.	Ref
124301	2001 QD_{62}	—	August 16, 2001	Socorro	LINEAR	·	2.0 km	MPC · JPL
124302	2001 QL_{62}	—	August 16, 2001	Socorro	LINEAR	NYS	1.8 km	MPC · JPL
124303	2001 QR_{63}	—	August 16, 2001	Socorro	LINEAR	·	1.4 km	MPC · JPL
124304	2001 QJ_{64}	—	August 16, 2001	Socorro	LINEAR	·	2.5 km	MPC · JPL
124305	2001 QN_{64}	—	August 16, 2001	Socorro	LINEAR	·	1.4 km	MPC · JPL
124306	2001 QR_{64}	—	August 16, 2001	Socorro	LINEAR	·	2.1 km	MPC · JPL
124307	2001 QY_{64}	—	August 16, 2001	Socorro	LINEAR	·	2.1 km	MPC · JPL
124308	2001 QM_{69}	—	August 17, 2001	Socorro	LINEAR	(2076)	2.3 km	MPC · JPL
124309	2001 QZ_{69}	—	August 17, 2001	Socorro	LINEAR	·	1.7 km	MPC · JPL
124310	2001 QS_{72}	—	August 18, 2001	Palomar	NEAT	·	3.4 km	MPC · JPL
124311	2001 QO_{73}	—	August 21, 2001	Ametlla de Mar	J. Nomen	·	1.5 km	MPC · JPL
124312	2001 QT_{73}	—	August 16, 2001	Socorro	LINEAR	·	1.8 km	MPC · JPL
124313	2001 QX_{73}	—	August 16, 2001	Socorro	LINEAR	NYS	2.3 km	MPC · JPL
124314	2001 QF_{74}	—	August 16, 2001	Socorro	LINEAR	·	2.8 km	MPC · JPL
124315	2001 QY_{77}	—	August 16, 2001	Socorro	LINEAR	·	2.4 km	MPC · JPL
124316	2001 QX_{78}	—	August 16, 2001	Socorro	LINEAR	·	1.9 km	MPC · JPL
124317	2001 QS_{80}	—	August 17, 2001	Socorro	LINEAR	V	1.3 km	MPC · JPL
124318	2001 QZ_{82}	—	August 17, 2001	Socorro	LINEAR	·	2.0 km	MPC · JPL
124319	2001 QL_{83}	—	August 17, 2001	Socorro	LINEAR	V	1.7 km	MPC · JPL
124320	2001 QC_{85}	—	August 19, 2001	Socorro	LINEAR	·	970 m	MPC · JPL
124321	2001 QL_{85}	—	August 19, 2001	Socorro	LINEAR	·	2.3 km	MPC · JPL
124322	2001 QK_{92}	—	August 20, 2001	Socorro	LINEAR	H	1.1 km	MPC · JPL
124323	2001 QO_{94}	—	August 23, 2001	Desert Eagle	W. K. Y. Yeung	·	3.0 km	MPC · JPL
124324	2001 QR_{96}	—	August 16, 2001	Socorro	LINEAR	·	1.3 km	MPC · JPL
124325	2001 QR_{97}	—	August 17, 2001	Socorro	LINEAR	·	2.7 km	MPC · JPL
124326	2001 QU_{97}	—	August 17, 2001	Socorro	LINEAR	·	1.5 km	MPC · JPL
124327	2001 QW_{97}	—	August 17, 2001	Socorro	LINEAR	·	2.2 km	MPC · JPL
124328	2001 QR_{98}	—	August 20, 2001	Socorro	LINEAR	·	1.6 km	MPC · JPL
124329	2001 QU_{98}	—	August 20, 2001	Socorro	LINEAR	·	2.2 km	MPC · JPL
124330	2001 QG_{101}	—	August 18, 2001	Socorro	LINEAR	·	1.5 km	MPC · JPL
124331	2001 QZ_{102}	—	August 19, 2001	Socorro	LINEAR	·	1.8 km	MPC · JPL
124332	2001 QB_{104}	—	August 20, 2001	Socorro	LINEAR	·	1.4 km	MPC · JPL
124333	2001 QM_{105}	—	August 23, 2001	Socorro	LINEAR	·	2.2 km	MPC · JPL
124334	2001 QC_{108}	—	August 25, 2001	Anderson Mesa	LONEOS	·	1.6 km	MPC · JPL
124335	2001 QL_{108}	—	August 24, 2001	Desert Eagle	W. K. Y. Yeung	·	1.5 km	MPC · JPL
124336	2001 QZ_{109}	—	August 21, 2001	Haleakala	NEAT	·	1.3 km	MPC · JPL
124337	2001 QC_{110}	—	August 21, 2001	Haleakala	NEAT	·	2.2 km	MPC · JPL
124338	2001 QE_{110}	—	August 24, 2001	Palomar	NEAT	·	1.2 km	MPC · JPL
124339	2001 QV_{111}	—	August 22, 2001	Socorro	LINEAR	·	2.3 km	MPC · JPL
124340	2001 QM_{112}	—	August 25, 2001	Socorro	LINEAR	·	1.2 km	MPC · JPL
124341	2001 QT_{114}	—	August 17, 2001	Socorro	LINEAR	V	1.2 km	MPC · JPL
124342	2001 QL_{116}	—	August 17, 2001	Socorro	LINEAR	V	1.2 km	MPC · JPL
124343	2001 QF_{117}	—	August 17, 2001	Socorro	LINEAR	·	1.7 km	MPC · JPL
124344	2001 QL_{117}	—	August 17, 2001	Socorro	LINEAR	·	2.6 km	MPC · JPL
124345	2001 QP_{117}	—	August 17, 2001	Socorro	LINEAR	·	2.0 km	MPC · JPL
124346	2001 QC_{118}	—	August 17, 2001	Socorro	LINEAR	·	2.0 km	MPC · JPL
124347	2001 QP_{119}	—	August 18, 2001	Socorro	LINEAR	·	1.6 km	MPC · JPL
124348	2001 QF_{120}	—	August 18, 2001	Socorro	LINEAR	·	1.8 km	MPC · JPL
124349	2001 QX_{120}	—	August 19, 2001	Socorro	LINEAR	·	1.6 km	MPC · JPL
124350	2001 QX_{122}	—	August 19, 2001	Socorro	LINEAR	·	1.3 km	MPC · JPL
124351	2001 QF_{124}	—	August 19, 2001	Socorro	LINEAR	·	1.8 km	MPC · JPL
124352	2001 QD_{126}	—	August 20, 2001	Socorro	LINEAR	·	1.8 km	MPC · JPL
124353	2001 QC_{127}	—	August 20, 2001	Socorro	LINEAR	V	1.1 km	MPC · JPL
124354	2001 QM_{127}	—	August 20, 2001	Socorro	LINEAR	·	1.5 km	MPC · JPL
124355	2001 QW_{128}	—	August 20, 2001	Socorro	LINEAR	·	1.6 km	MPC · JPL
124356	2001 QA_{129}	—	August 20, 2001	Socorro	LINEAR	·	2.2 km	MPC · JPL
124357	2001 QH_{129}	—	August 20, 2001	Socorro	LINEAR	PHO	2.1 km	MPC · JPL
124358	2001 QA_{131}	—	August 20, 2001	Socorro	LINEAR	·	1.7 km	MPC · JPL
124359	2001 QV_{131}	—	August 20, 2001	Socorro	LINEAR	V	1.1 km	MPC · JPL
124360	2001 QR_{133}	—	August 21, 2001	Socorro	LINEAR	·	2.1 km	MPC · JPL
124361	2001 QW_{133}	—	August 21, 2001	Socorro	LINEAR	·	2.3 km	MPC · JPL
124362	2001 QZ_{134}	—	August 22, 2001	Socorro	LINEAR	·	1.8 km	MPC · JPL
124363	2001 QM_{136}	—	August 22, 2001	Socorro	LINEAR	·	4.4 km	MPC · JPL
124364	2001 QB_{138}	—	August 22, 2001	Socorro	LINEAR	·	3.2 km	MPC · JPL
124365	2001 QL_{138}	—	August 22, 2001	Socorro	LINEAR	V	1.4 km	MPC · JPL
124366	2001 QV_{140}	—	August 22, 2001	Socorro	LINEAR	·	3.1 km	MPC · JPL
124367	2001 QD_{142}	—	August 24, 2001	Socorro	LINEAR	NYS	2.5 km	MPC · JPL
124368 Nickphoenix	2001 QT_{142}	Nickphoenix	August 24, 2001	Goodricke-Pigott	R. A. Tucker	·	2.1 km	MPC · JPL
124369	2001 QS_{147}	—	August 20, 2001	Palomar	NEAT	·	2.4 km	MPC · JPL
124370	2001 QX_{149}	—	August 25, 2001	Palomar	NEAT	·	2.9 km	MPC · JPL
124371	2001 QJ_{152}	—	August 25, 2001	Desert Eagle	W. K. Y. Yeung	·	1.6 km	MPC · JPL
124372	2001 QN_{152}	—	August 26, 2001	Desert Eagle	W. K. Y. Yeung	NYS	2.4 km	MPC · JPL
124373	2001 QP_{152}	—	August 26, 2001	Desert Eagle	W. K. Y. Yeung	·	2.1 km	MPC · JPL
124374	2001 QU_{152}	—	August 26, 2001	Desert Eagle	W. K. Y. Yeung	(2076)	2.0 km	MPC · JPL
124375	2001 QV_{152}	—	August 26, 2001	Desert Eagle	W. K. Y. Yeung	·	1.3 km	MPC · JPL
124376	2001 QG_{155}	—	August 23, 2001	Anderson Mesa	LONEOS	·	1.5 km	MPC · JPL
124377	2001 QG_{157}	—	August 23, 2001	Anderson Mesa	LONEOS	·	1.4 km	MPC · JPL
124378	2001 QH_{157}	—	August 23, 2001	Anderson Mesa	LONEOS	·	2.2 km	MPC · JPL
124379	2001 QY_{158}	—	August 23, 2001	Anderson Mesa	LONEOS	·	1.3 km	MPC · JPL
124380	2001 QK_{161}	—	August 23, 2001	Anderson Mesa	LONEOS	·	1.3 km	MPC · JPL
124381	2001 QB_{164}	—	August 20, 2001	Palomar	NEAT	·	1.9 km	MPC · JPL
124382	2001 QX_{165}	—	August 24, 2001	Haleakala	NEAT	V	1.1 km	MPC · JPL
124383	2001 QF_{167}	—	August 24, 2001	Haleakala	NEAT	·	1.6 km	MPC · JPL
124384	2001 QE_{168}	—	August 25, 2001	Haleakala	NEAT	·	1.6 km	MPC · JPL
124385	2001 QC_{174}	—	August 26, 2001	Socorro	LINEAR	·	2.8 km	MPC · JPL
124386	2001 QJ_{175}	—	August 21, 2001	Kitt Peak	Spacewatch	·	2.2 km	MPC · JPL
124387	2001 QB_{178}	—	August 27, 2001	Palomar	NEAT	·	2.1 km	MPC · JPL
124388	2001 QN_{178}	—	August 26, 2001	Haleakala	NEAT	·	2.2 km	MPC · JPL
124389	2001 QG_{179}	—	August 28, 2001	Palomar	NEAT	·	1.7 km	MPC · JPL
124390	2001 QU_{179}	—	August 25, 2001	Palomar	NEAT	NYS	2.2 km	MPC · JPL
124391	2001 QX_{179}	—	August 25, 2001	Palomar	NEAT	·	2.2 km	MPC · JPL
124392	2001 QZ_{181}	—	August 29, 2001	Palomar	NEAT	V	1.5 km	MPC · JPL
124393	2001 QM_{186}	—	August 21, 2001	Kitt Peak	Spacewatch	NYS ·	2.8 km	MPC · JPL
124394	2001 QF_{187}	—	August 21, 2001	Haleakala	NEAT	MAS	1.5 km	MPC · JPL
124395	2001 QA_{189}	—	August 22, 2001	Kitt Peak	Spacewatch	V	1.1 km	MPC · JPL
124396	2001 QJ_{189}	—	August 22, 2001	Socorro	LINEAR	PHO	4.4 km	MPC · JPL
124397	2001 QR_{190}	—	August 22, 2001	Socorro	LINEAR	·	2.0 km	MPC · JPL
124398 Iraklisimonia	2001 QK_{197}	Iraklisimonia	August 22, 2001	Goodricke-Pigott	R. A. Tucker	·	6.2 km	MPC · JPL
124399	2001 QN_{197}	—	August 22, 2001	Palomar	NEAT	·	3.6 km	MPC · JPL
124400	2001 QB_{198}	—	August 22, 2001	Socorro	LINEAR	V	2.2 km	MPC · JPL

== 124401–124500 ==
back to top

Designation			Discovery			Properties		Ref
Permanent	Provisional	Named after	Date	Site	Discoverer(s)	Category	Diam.	Ref
124401	2001 QF_{198}	—	August 22, 2001	Socorro	LINEAR	·	3.4 km	MPC · JPL
124402	2001 QQ_{198}	—	August 22, 2001	Socorro	LINEAR	·	1.6 km	MPC · JPL
124403	2001 QZ_{204}	—	August 23, 2001	Anderson Mesa	LONEOS	·	1.5 km	MPC · JPL
124404	2001 QR_{205}	—	August 23, 2001	Anderson Mesa	LONEOS	·	910 m	MPC · JPL
124405	2001 QN_{206}	—	August 23, 2001	Anderson Mesa	LONEOS	·	1.0 km	MPC · JPL
124406	2001 QO_{206}	—	August 23, 2001	Anderson Mesa	LONEOS	·	950 m	MPC · JPL
124407	2001 QS_{206}	—	August 23, 2001	Anderson Mesa	LONEOS	NYS	2.2 km	MPC · JPL
124408	2001 QN_{208}	—	August 23, 2001	Anderson Mesa	LONEOS	·	1.3 km	MPC · JPL
124409	2001 QP_{211}	—	August 23, 2001	Anderson Mesa	LONEOS	NYS	1.8 km	MPC · JPL
124410	2001 QW_{211}	—	August 23, 2001	Anderson Mesa	LONEOS	·	1.7 km	MPC · JPL
124411	2001 QD_{212}	—	August 23, 2001	Anderson Mesa	LONEOS	·	2.9 km	MPC · JPL
124412	2001 QR_{213}	—	August 23, 2001	Anderson Mesa	LONEOS	·	1.7 km	MPC · JPL
124413	2001 QD_{214}	—	August 23, 2001	Anderson Mesa	LONEOS	·	1.9 km	MPC · JPL
124414	2001 QM_{214}	—	August 23, 2001	Anderson Mesa	LONEOS	PHO	2.3 km	MPC · JPL
124415	2001 QA_{219}	—	August 23, 2001	Anderson Mesa	LONEOS	PHO	1.9 km	MPC · JPL
124416	2001 QV_{223}	—	August 24, 2001	Anderson Mesa	LONEOS	·	1.8 km	MPC · JPL
124417	2001 QW_{223}	—	August 24, 2001	Anderson Mesa	LONEOS	V	1.1 km	MPC · JPL
124418	2001 QL_{224}	—	August 24, 2001	Socorro	LINEAR	·	1.2 km	MPC · JPL
124419	2001 QT_{229}	—	August 24, 2001	Anderson Mesa	LONEOS	·	2.0 km	MPC · JPL
124420	2001 QM_{230}	—	August 24, 2001	Anderson Mesa	LONEOS	·	1.5 km	MPC · JPL
124421	2001 QM_{233}	—	August 24, 2001	Socorro	LINEAR	NYS	1.5 km	MPC · JPL
124422	2001 QL_{234}	—	August 24, 2001	Socorro	LINEAR	·	1.4 km	MPC · JPL
124423	2001 QE_{235}	—	August 24, 2001	Socorro	LINEAR	MAS	1.1 km	MPC · JPL
124424	2001 QL_{237}	—	August 24, 2001	Socorro	LINEAR	·	1.2 km	MPC · JPL
124425	2001 QU_{238}	—	August 24, 2001	Socorro	LINEAR	PHO	1.8 km	MPC · JPL
124426	2001 QE_{239}	—	August 24, 2001	Socorro	LINEAR	·	1.3 km	MPC · JPL
124427	2001 QW_{239}	—	August 24, 2001	Socorro	LINEAR	·	1.6 km	MPC · JPL
124428	2001 QU_{241}	—	August 24, 2001	Socorro	LINEAR	·	2.2 km	MPC · JPL
124429	2001 QX_{242}	—	August 24, 2001	Socorro	LINEAR	·	1.4 km	MPC · JPL
124430	2001 QE_{246}	—	August 24, 2001	Socorro	LINEAR	·	2.2 km	MPC · JPL
124431	2001 QD_{247}	—	August 24, 2001	Socorro	LINEAR	·	2.7 km	MPC · JPL
124432	2001 QJ_{247}	—	August 24, 2001	Socorro	LINEAR	MAS	1.6 km	MPC · JPL
124433	2001 QM_{247}	—	August 24, 2001	Socorro	LINEAR	·	4.0 km	MPC · JPL
124434	2001 QR_{247}	—	August 24, 2001	Socorro	LINEAR	·	1.3 km	MPC · JPL
124435	2001 QS_{247}	—	August 24, 2001	Socorro	LINEAR	NYS	2.2 km	MPC · JPL
124436	2001 QG_{248}	—	August 24, 2001	Socorro	LINEAR	·	1.8 km	MPC · JPL
124437	2001 QN_{248}	—	August 24, 2001	Socorro	LINEAR	·	2.1 km	MPC · JPL
124438	2001 QV_{248}	—	August 24, 2001	Socorro	LINEAR	·	2.8 km	MPC · JPL
124439	2001 QG_{249}	—	August 24, 2001	Socorro	LINEAR	·	1.1 km	MPC · JPL
124440	2001 QB_{257}	—	August 25, 2001	Socorro	LINEAR	·	2.4 km	MPC · JPL
124441	2001 QN_{258}	—	August 25, 2001	Socorro	LINEAR	NYS	1.8 km	MPC · JPL
124442	2001 QY_{259}	—	August 25, 2001	Socorro	LINEAR	·	3.7 km	MPC · JPL
124443	2001 QQ_{260}	—	August 25, 2001	Socorro	LINEAR	·	1.6 km	MPC · JPL
124444	2001 QF_{261}	—	August 25, 2001	Socorro	LINEAR	·	1.8 km	MPC · JPL
124445	2001 QG_{262}	—	August 25, 2001	Socorro	LINEAR	·	1.8 km	MPC · JPL
124446	2001 QJ_{262}	—	August 25, 2001	Socorro	LINEAR	·	2.2 km	MPC · JPL
124447	2001 QA_{263}	—	August 25, 2001	Socorro	LINEAR	NYS ·	3.4 km	MPC · JPL
124448	2001 QC_{263}	—	August 25, 2001	Socorro	LINEAR	NYS ·	1.9 km	MPC · JPL
124449	2001 QZ_{263}	—	August 25, 2001	Anderson Mesa	LONEOS	·	3.1 km	MPC · JPL
124450 Shyamalan	2001 QN_{264}	Shyamalan	August 25, 2001	Goodricke-Pigott	R. A. Tucker	·	3.3 km	MPC · JPL
124451	2001 QU_{269}	—	August 19, 2001	Socorro	LINEAR	(2076)	1.3 km	MPC · JPL
124452	2001 QA_{270}	—	August 19, 2001	Socorro	LINEAR	NYS	2.5 km	MPC · JPL
124453	2001 QM_{270}	—	August 19, 2001	Socorro	LINEAR	·	1.3 km	MPC · JPL
124454	2001 QG_{271}	—	August 19, 2001	Socorro	LINEAR	·	1.8 km	MPC · JPL
124455	2001 QX_{272}	—	August 19, 2001	Socorro	LINEAR	·	1.3 km	MPC · JPL
124456	2001 QC_{278}	—	August 19, 2001	Socorro	LINEAR	(2076)	1.4 km	MPC · JPL
124457	2001 QE_{280}	—	August 19, 2001	Socorro	LINEAR	·	1.4 km	MPC · JPL
124458	2001 QU_{282}	—	August 19, 2001	Haleakala	NEAT	V	1.1 km	MPC · JPL
124459	2001 QE_{284}	—	August 18, 2001	Palomar	NEAT	·	2.0 km	MPC · JPL
124460	2001 QM_{292}	—	August 16, 2001	Socorro	LINEAR	BAP	2.8 km	MPC · JPL
124461	2001 QE_{295}	—	August 24, 2001	Socorro	LINEAR	NYS	2.1 km	MPC · JPL
124462	2001 QG_{295}	—	August 24, 2001	Socorro	LINEAR	·	2.6 km	MPC · JPL
124463	2001 QQ_{295}	—	August 24, 2001	Socorro	LINEAR	·	3.7 km	MPC · JPL
124464	2001 QV_{295}	—	August 24, 2001	Socorro	LINEAR	·	1.1 km	MPC · JPL
124465	2001 QF_{296}	—	August 24, 2001	Socorro	LINEAR	V	1.3 km	MPC · JPL
124466	2001 QF_{327}	—	August 23, 2001	Haleakala	NEAT	·	1.5 km	MPC · JPL
124467	2001 QW_{327}	—	August 19, 2001	Socorro	LINEAR	·	1.5 km	MPC · JPL
124468	2001 QB_{329}	—	August 16, 2001	Socorro	LINEAR	V	1.1 km	MPC · JPL
124469	2001 QA_{330}	—	August 25, 2001	Anderson Mesa	LONEOS	·	2.0 km	MPC · JPL
124470	2001 RL_{4}	—	September 8, 2001	Socorro	LINEAR	·	1.3 km	MPC · JPL
124471	2001 RD_{5}	—	September 8, 2001	Socorro	LINEAR	·	2.0 km	MPC · JPL
124472	2001 RJ_{5}	—	September 8, 2001	Socorro	LINEAR	NYS	1.1 km	MPC · JPL
124473	2001 RB_{6}	—	September 8, 2001	Socorro	LINEAR	PHO	2.3 km	MPC · JPL
124474	2001 RQ_{6}	—	September 10, 2001	Desert Eagle	W. K. Y. Yeung	·	1.7 km	MPC · JPL
124475	2001 RX_{6}	—	September 10, 2001	Desert Eagle	W. K. Y. Yeung	NYS ·	3.4 km	MPC · JPL
124476	2001 RB_{7}	—	September 10, 2001	Desert Eagle	W. K. Y. Yeung	(5)	1.7 km	MPC · JPL
124477	2001 RD_{7}	—	September 10, 2001	Desert Eagle	W. K. Y. Yeung	·	1.6 km	MPC · JPL
124478	2001 RG_{12}	—	September 7, 2001	Socorro	LINEAR	·	2.0 km	MPC · JPL
124479	2001 RA_{13}	—	September 9, 2001	Socorro	LINEAR	NYS · fast	2.0 km	MPC · JPL
124480	2001 RP_{13}	—	September 10, 2001	Socorro	LINEAR	·	1.3 km	MPC · JPL
124481	2001 RZ_{18}	—	September 7, 2001	Socorro	LINEAR	·	3.9 km	MPC · JPL
124482	2001 RM_{21}	—	September 7, 2001	Socorro	LINEAR	·	1.5 km	MPC · JPL
124483	2001 RS_{23}	—	September 7, 2001	Socorro	LINEAR	·	1.2 km	MPC · JPL
124484	2001 RT_{24}	—	September 7, 2001	Socorro	LINEAR	·	1.1 km	MPC · JPL
124485	2001 RF_{25}	—	September 7, 2001	Socorro	LINEAR	MAS	900 m	MPC · JPL
124486	2001 RG_{25}	—	September 7, 2001	Socorro	LINEAR	·	1.5 km	MPC · JPL
124487	2001 RT_{27}	—	September 7, 2001	Socorro	LINEAR	V	1.3 km	MPC · JPL
124488	2001 RU_{35}	—	September 8, 2001	Socorro	LINEAR	·	1.4 km	MPC · JPL
124489	2001 RB_{36}	—	September 8, 2001	Socorro	LINEAR	·	1.5 km	MPC · JPL
124490	2001 RF_{36}	—	September 8, 2001	Socorro	LINEAR	V	1.2 km	MPC · JPL
124491	2001 RE_{38}	—	September 8, 2001	Socorro	LINEAR	MAS	930 m	MPC · JPL
124492	2001 RO_{38}	—	September 8, 2001	Socorro	LINEAR	·	2.2 km	MPC · JPL
124493	2001 RT_{43}	—	September 10, 2001	Desert Eagle	W. K. Y. Yeung	·	2.2 km	MPC · JPL
124494	2001 RE_{44}	—	September 12, 2001	Palomar	NEAT	(2076)	2.5 km	MPC · JPL
124495	2001 RR_{44}	—	September 12, 2001	Palomar	NEAT	NYS	2.6 km	MPC · JPL
124496	2001 RS_{44}	—	September 13, 2001	Palomar	NEAT	·	3.6 km	MPC · JPL
124497	2001 RF_{45}	—	September 12, 2001	Palomar	NEAT	·	3.9 km	MPC · JPL
124498	2001 RS_{45}	—	September 14, 2001	Palomar	NEAT	·	1.3 km	MPC · JPL
124499	2001 RK_{46}	—	September 12, 2001	Desert Eagle	W. K. Y. Yeung	·	1.7 km	MPC · JPL
124500	2001 RL_{49}	—	September 9, 2001	Socorro	LINEAR	·	1.3 km	MPC · JPL

== 124501–124600 ==
back to top

Designation			Discovery			Properties		Ref
Permanent	Provisional	Named after	Date	Site	Discoverer(s)	Category	Diam.	Ref
124501	2001 RO_{49}	—	September 10, 2001	Socorro	LINEAR	·	1.9 km	MPC · JPL
124502	2001 RP_{49}	—	September 10, 2001	Socorro	LINEAR	·	2.0 km	MPC · JPL
124503	2001 RK_{51}	—	September 11, 2001	Socorro	LINEAR	PHO	2.1 km	MPC · JPL
124504	2001 RL_{54}	—	September 12, 2001	Socorro	LINEAR	·	1.3 km	MPC · JPL
124505	2001 RO_{58}	—	September 12, 2001	Socorro	LINEAR	NYS	2.0 km	MPC · JPL
124506	2001 RN_{62}	—	September 12, 2001	Socorro	LINEAR	·	2.3 km	MPC · JPL
124507	2001 RU_{64}	—	September 10, 2001	Socorro	LINEAR	·	1.9 km	MPC · JPL
124508	2001 RY_{64}	—	September 10, 2001	Socorro	LINEAR	V	1.1 km	MPC · JPL
124509	2001 RM_{65}	—	September 10, 2001	Socorro	LINEAR	·	2.6 km	MPC · JPL
124510	2001 RN_{65}	—	September 10, 2001	Socorro	LINEAR	·	2.1 km	MPC · JPL
124511	2001 RX_{65}	—	September 10, 2001	Socorro	LINEAR	·	4.4 km	MPC · JPL
124512	2001 RK_{67}	—	September 10, 2001	Socorro	LINEAR	·	5.1 km	MPC · JPL
124513	2001 RN_{68}	—	September 10, 2001	Socorro	LINEAR	·	1.4 km	MPC · JPL
124514	2001 RE_{69}	—	September 10, 2001	Socorro	LINEAR	V	1.5 km	MPC · JPL
124515	2001 RJ_{69}	—	September 10, 2001	Socorro	LINEAR	·	1.4 km	MPC · JPL
124516	2001 RO_{71}	—	September 10, 2001	Socorro	LINEAR	·	1.3 km	MPC · JPL
124517	2001 RC_{72}	—	September 10, 2001	Socorro	LINEAR	·	1.4 km	MPC · JPL
124518	2001 RU_{73}	—	September 10, 2001	Socorro	LINEAR	(2076)	2.0 km	MPC · JPL
124519	2001 RT_{75}	—	September 10, 2001	Socorro	LINEAR	·	2.0 km	MPC · JPL
124520	2001 RX_{75}	—	September 10, 2001	Socorro	LINEAR	·	3.8 km	MPC · JPL
124521	2001 RC_{77}	—	September 10, 2001	Socorro	LINEAR	·	1.7 km	MPC · JPL
124522	2001 RN_{77}	—	September 10, 2001	Socorro	LINEAR	(2076)	2.5 km	MPC · JPL
124523	2001 RL_{78}	—	September 10, 2001	Socorro	LINEAR	·	2.3 km	MPC · JPL
124524	2001 RB_{80}	—	September 9, 2001	Palomar	NEAT	·	2.2 km	MPC · JPL
124525	2001 RE_{81}	—	September 14, 2001	Palomar	NEAT	·	3.2 km	MPC · JPL
124526	2001 RG_{83}	—	September 11, 2001	Anderson Mesa	LONEOS	·	1.8 km	MPC · JPL
124527	2001 RR_{84}	—	September 11, 2001	Anderson Mesa	LONEOS	·	2.1 km	MPC · JPL
124528	2001 RX_{86}	—	September 11, 2001	Anderson Mesa	LONEOS	·	1.8 km	MPC · JPL
124529	2001 RL_{88}	—	September 11, 2001	Anderson Mesa	LONEOS	NYS	2.1 km	MPC · JPL
124530	2001 RN_{89}	—	September 11, 2001	Anderson Mesa	LONEOS	·	2.2 km	MPC · JPL
124531	2001 RO_{90}	—	September 11, 2001	Anderson Mesa	LONEOS	·	1.3 km	MPC · JPL
124532	2001 RB_{91}	—	September 11, 2001	Anderson Mesa	LONEOS	·	1.2 km	MPC · JPL
124533	2001 RT_{91}	—	September 11, 2001	Anderson Mesa	LONEOS	·	1.4 km	MPC · JPL
124534	2001 RF_{94}	—	September 11, 2001	Anderson Mesa	LONEOS	·	1.0 km	MPC · JPL
124535	2001 RJ_{94}	—	September 11, 2001	Anderson Mesa	LONEOS	·	2.0 km	MPC · JPL
124536	2001 RP_{94}	—	September 11, 2001	Anderson Mesa	LONEOS	·	3.5 km	MPC · JPL
124537	2001 RC_{95}	—	September 11, 2001	Anderson Mesa	LONEOS	·	2.2 km	MPC · JPL
124538	2001 RC_{96}	—	September 11, 2001	Kitt Peak	Spacewatch	NYS	3.2 km	MPC · JPL
124539	2001 RD_{96}	—	September 11, 2001	Kitt Peak	Spacewatch	·	1.8 km	MPC · JPL
124540	2001 RY_{97}	—	September 12, 2001	Kitt Peak	Spacewatch	·	2.0 km	MPC · JPL
124541	2001 RC_{98}	—	September 12, 2001	Kitt Peak	Spacewatch	·	1.8 km	MPC · JPL
124542	2001 RP_{99}	—	September 12, 2001	Socorro	LINEAR	ERI	2.6 km	MPC · JPL
124543	2001 RO_{101}	—	September 12, 2001	Socorro	LINEAR	·	2.6 km	MPC · JPL
124544	2001 RV_{108}	—	September 12, 2001	Socorro	LINEAR	·	1.0 km	MPC · JPL
124545	2001 RZ_{108}	—	September 12, 2001	Socorro	LINEAR	·	1.0 km	MPC · JPL
124546	2001 RA_{112}	—	September 12, 2001	Socorro	LINEAR	NYS	1.7 km	MPC · JPL
124547	2001 RG_{121}	—	September 12, 2001	Socorro	LINEAR	MAS	1.1 km	MPC · JPL
124548	2001 RT_{126}	—	September 12, 2001	Socorro	LINEAR	·	2.2 km	MPC · JPL
124549	2001 RQ_{130}	—	September 12, 2001	Socorro	LINEAR	MAS	1.5 km	MPC · JPL
124550	2001 RQ_{131}	—	September 12, 2001	Socorro	LINEAR	·	2.3 km	MPC · JPL
124551	2001 RS_{132}	—	September 12, 2001	Socorro	LINEAR	·	2.6 km	MPC · JPL
124552	2001 RE_{134}	—	September 12, 2001	Socorro	LINEAR	·	2.3 km	MPC · JPL
124553	2001 RW_{134}	—	September 12, 2001	Socorro	LINEAR	·	1.3 km	MPC · JPL
124554	2001 RO_{136}	—	September 12, 2001	Socorro	LINEAR	·	3.8 km	MPC · JPL
124555	2001 RV_{136}	—	September 12, 2001	Socorro	LINEAR	·	2.5 km	MPC · JPL
124556	2001 RK_{137}	—	September 12, 2001	Socorro	LINEAR	NYS	2.5 km	MPC · JPL
124557	2001 RD_{139}	—	September 12, 2001	Socorro	LINEAR	NYS	1.9 km	MPC · JPL
124558	2001 RJ_{151}	—	September 11, 2001	Anderson Mesa	LONEOS	V	1.3 km	MPC · JPL
124559	2001 RR_{152}	—	September 11, 2001	Anderson Mesa	LONEOS	·	1.4 km	MPC · JPL
124560	2001 RP_{154}	—	September 11, 2001	Anderson Mesa	LONEOS	·	2.1 km	MPC · JPL
124561	2001 ST	—	September 17, 2001	Fountain Hills	C. W. Juels, P. R. Holvorcem	·	3.3 km	MPC · JPL
124562	2001 SU	—	September 17, 2001	Fountain Hills	C. W. Juels, P. R. Holvorcem	·	5.1 km	MPC · JPL
124563	2001 SO_{1}	—	September 17, 2001	Desert Eagle	W. K. Y. Yeung	·	910 m	MPC · JPL
124564	2001 SS_{1}	—	September 17, 2001	Desert Eagle	W. K. Y. Yeung	·	1.4 km	MPC · JPL
124565	2001 SD_{2}	—	September 17, 2001	Desert Eagle	W. K. Y. Yeung	·	1.2 km	MPC · JPL
124566	2001 SN_{2}	—	September 17, 2001	Desert Eagle	W. K. Y. Yeung	MAS	1.8 km	MPC · JPL
124567	2001 SO_{2}	—	September 17, 2001	Desert Eagle	W. K. Y. Yeung	MAS	1.3 km	MPC · JPL
124568	2001 SV_{2}	—	September 17, 2001	Desert Eagle	W. K. Y. Yeung	NYS	1.9 km	MPC · JPL
124569	2001 SJ_{4}	—	September 17, 2001	Goodricke-Pigott	R. A. Tucker	NYS	2.4 km	MPC · JPL
124570	2001 SS_{4}	—	September 18, 2001	Goodricke-Pigott	R. A. Tucker	·	1.9 km	MPC · JPL
124571	2001 SV_{4}	—	September 18, 2001	Goodricke-Pigott	R. A. Tucker	·	1.3 km	MPC · JPL
124572	2001 SX_{5}	—	September 17, 2001	Socorro	LINEAR	PHO	1.8 km	MPC · JPL
124573	2001 SS_{9}	—	September 18, 2001	Desert Eagle	W. K. Y. Yeung	·	2.0 km	MPC · JPL
124574	2001 ST_{9}	—	September 18, 2001	Desert Eagle	W. K. Y. Yeung	·	2.3 km	MPC · JPL
124575	2001 SJ_{12}	—	September 16, 2001	Socorro	LINEAR	·	3.9 km	MPC · JPL
124576	2001 SS_{12}	—	September 16, 2001	Socorro	LINEAR	·	1.3 km	MPC · JPL
124577	2001 SX_{13}	—	September 16, 2001	Socorro	LINEAR	·	920 m	MPC · JPL
124578	2001 SE_{14}	—	September 16, 2001	Socorro	LINEAR	·	2.2 km	MPC · JPL
124579	2001 SF_{15}	—	September 16, 2001	Socorro	LINEAR	·	2.0 km	MPC · JPL
124580	2001 SJ_{15}	—	September 16, 2001	Socorro	LINEAR	·	1.5 km	MPC · JPL
124581	2001 SN_{15}	—	September 16, 2001	Socorro	LINEAR	·	2.2 km	MPC · JPL
124582	2001 SW_{15}	—	September 16, 2001	Socorro	LINEAR	·	1.2 km	MPC · JPL
124583	2001 SF_{16}	—	September 16, 2001	Socorro	LINEAR	·	970 m	MPC · JPL
124584	2001 SN_{16}	—	September 16, 2001	Socorro	LINEAR	·	1.5 km	MPC · JPL
124585	2001 SG_{17}	—	September 16, 2001	Socorro	LINEAR	MAS	980 m	MPC · JPL
124586	2001 SU_{18}	—	September 16, 2001	Socorro	LINEAR	·	1.7 km	MPC · JPL
124587	2001 SR_{20}	—	September 16, 2001	Socorro	LINEAR	·	2.2 km	MPC · JPL
124588	2001 SD_{21}	—	September 16, 2001	Socorro	LINEAR	·	2.1 km	MPC · JPL
124589	2001 SV_{21}	—	September 16, 2001	Socorro	LINEAR	NYS	2.2 km	MPC · JPL
124590	2001 SW_{23}	—	September 16, 2001	Socorro	LINEAR	·	1.2 km	MPC · JPL
124591	2001 SX_{23}	—	September 16, 2001	Socorro	LINEAR	·	1.9 km	MPC · JPL
124592	2001 SK_{24}	—	September 16, 2001	Socorro	LINEAR	·	3.8 km	MPC · JPL
124593	2001 ST_{24}	—	September 16, 2001	Socorro	LINEAR	·	2.1 km	MPC · JPL
124594	2001 SR_{25}	—	September 16, 2001	Socorro	LINEAR	V	1.6 km	MPC · JPL
124595	2001 SZ_{25}	—	September 16, 2001	Socorro	LINEAR	·	1.3 km	MPC · JPL
124596	2001 SG_{26}	—	September 16, 2001	Socorro	LINEAR	PHO	3.6 km	MPC · JPL
124597	2001 SY_{26}	—	September 16, 2001	Socorro	LINEAR	·	2.6 km	MPC · JPL
124598	2001 SN_{27}	—	September 16, 2001	Socorro	LINEAR	·	980 m	MPC · JPL
124599	2001 SR_{28}	—	September 16, 2001	Socorro	LINEAR	·	1.4 km	MPC · JPL
124600	2001 SX_{28}	—	September 16, 2001	Socorro	LINEAR	NYS	2.1 km	MPC · JPL

== 124601–124700 ==
back to top

Designation			Discovery			Properties		Ref
Permanent	Provisional	Named after	Date	Site	Discoverer(s)	Category	Diam.	Ref
124601	2001 SM_{29}	—	September 16, 2001	Socorro	LINEAR	·	1.9 km	MPC · JPL
124602	2001 SW_{30}	—	September 16, 2001	Socorro	LINEAR	·	1.7 km	MPC · JPL
124603	2001 SZ_{33}	—	September 16, 2001	Socorro	LINEAR	·	3.4 km	MPC · JPL
124604	2001 SL_{34}	—	September 16, 2001	Socorro	LINEAR	NYS	3.6 km	MPC · JPL
124605	2001 SY_{38}	—	September 16, 2001	Socorro	LINEAR	PHO	3.2 km	MPC · JPL
124606	2001 SS_{39}	—	September 16, 2001	Socorro	LINEAR	NYS	1.6 km	MPC · JPL
124607	2001 SG_{40}	—	September 16, 2001	Socorro	LINEAR	·	1.7 km	MPC · JPL
124608	2001 SH_{40}	—	September 16, 2001	Socorro	LINEAR	·	3.9 km	MPC · JPL
124609	2001 SS_{40}	—	September 16, 2001	Socorro	LINEAR	·	1.9 km	MPC · JPL
124610	2001 SU_{42}	—	September 16, 2001	Socorro	LINEAR	MAS	1.2 km	MPC · JPL
124611	2001 SC_{43}	—	September 16, 2001	Socorro	LINEAR	NYS	2.1 km	MPC · JPL
124612	2001 SD_{44}	—	September 16, 2001	Socorro	LINEAR	NYS ·	2.2 km	MPC · JPL
124613	2001 SE_{45}	—	September 16, 2001	Socorro	LINEAR	NYS	1.5 km	MPC · JPL
124614	2001 SV_{45}	—	September 16, 2001	Socorro	LINEAR	·	1.2 km	MPC · JPL
124615	2001 SW_{46}	—	September 16, 2001	Socorro	LINEAR	·	1.6 km	MPC · JPL
124616	2001 SB_{48}	—	September 16, 2001	Socorro	LINEAR	·	1.5 km	MPC · JPL
124617	2001 SL_{48}	—	September 16, 2001	Socorro	LINEAR	·	1.8 km	MPC · JPL
124618	2001 SR_{48}	—	September 16, 2001	Socorro	LINEAR	·	1.3 km	MPC · JPL
124619	2001 SC_{49}	—	September 16, 2001	Socorro	LINEAR	fast	2.0 km	MPC · JPL
124620	2001 SS_{50}	—	September 16, 2001	Socorro	LINEAR	slow	2.7 km	MPC · JPL
124621	2001 SV_{50}	—	September 16, 2001	Socorro	LINEAR	·	1.1 km	MPC · JPL
124622	2001 SD_{52}	—	September 16, 2001	Socorro	LINEAR	·	1.1 km	MPC · JPL
124623	2001 SU_{54}	—	September 16, 2001	Socorro	LINEAR	·	1.4 km	MPC · JPL
124624	2001 SG_{56}	—	September 16, 2001	Socorro	LINEAR	·	3.0 km	MPC · JPL
124625	2001 SS_{57}	—	September 17, 2001	Socorro	LINEAR	(2076)	2.7 km	MPC · JPL
124626	2001 SG_{58}	—	September 17, 2001	Socorro	LINEAR	·	860 m	MPC · JPL
124627	2001 SF_{60}	—	September 17, 2001	Socorro	LINEAR	·	2.3 km	MPC · JPL
124628	2001 SY_{60}	—	September 17, 2001	Socorro	LINEAR	·	2.2 km	MPC · JPL
124629	2001 SK_{62}	—	September 17, 2001	Socorro	LINEAR	·	1.4 km	MPC · JPL
124630	2001 SM_{62}	—	September 17, 2001	Socorro	LINEAR	·	2.5 km	MPC · JPL
124631	2001 SW_{62}	—	September 17, 2001	Socorro	LINEAR	·	1.2 km	MPC · JPL
124632	2001 SA_{63}	—	September 17, 2001	Socorro	LINEAR	V	1.2 km	MPC · JPL
124633	2001 SR_{63}	—	September 17, 2001	Socorro	LINEAR	·	1.5 km	MPC · JPL
124634	2001 SL_{64}	—	September 17, 2001	Socorro	LINEAR	·	3.2 km	MPC · JPL
124635	2001 SL_{65}	—	September 17, 2001	Socorro	LINEAR	·	2.5 km	MPC · JPL
124636	2001 SS_{65}	—	September 17, 2001	Socorro	LINEAR	ERI	3.6 km	MPC · JPL
124637	2001 SV_{65}	—	September 17, 2001	Socorro	LINEAR	·	2.5 km	MPC · JPL
124638	2001 SG_{66}	—	September 17, 2001	Socorro	LINEAR	(2076)	1.5 km	MPC · JPL
124639	2001 SR_{66}	—	September 17, 2001	Socorro	LINEAR	V	1.0 km	MPC · JPL
124640	2001 SX_{66}	—	September 17, 2001	Socorro	LINEAR	·	3.1 km	MPC · JPL
124641	2001 SU_{67}	—	September 17, 2001	Socorro	LINEAR	·	2.0 km	MPC · JPL
124642	2001 SJ_{68}	—	September 17, 2001	Socorro	LINEAR	·	2.2 km	MPC · JPL
124643	2001 SQ_{68}	—	September 17, 2001	Socorro	LINEAR	·	4.4 km	MPC · JPL
124644	2001 SG_{69}	—	September 17, 2001	Socorro	LINEAR	·	2.0 km	MPC · JPL
124645	2001 SK_{69}	—	September 17, 2001	Socorro	LINEAR	·	2.5 km	MPC · JPL
124646	2001 SZ_{69}	—	September 17, 2001	Socorro	LINEAR	·	2.2 km	MPC · JPL
124647	2001 SB_{70}	—	September 17, 2001	Socorro	LINEAR	·	1.2 km	MPC · JPL
124648	2001 SD_{70}	—	September 17, 2001	Socorro	LINEAR	·	1.8 km	MPC · JPL
124649	2001 SM_{70}	—	September 17, 2001	Socorro	LINEAR	·	2.6 km	MPC · JPL
124650	2001 ST_{70}	—	September 17, 2001	Socorro	LINEAR	·	4.1 km	MPC · JPL
124651	2001 SZ_{71}	—	September 17, 2001	Socorro	LINEAR	·	2.6 km	MPC · JPL
124652	2001 SK_{72}	—	September 17, 2001	Socorro	LINEAR	V	2.3 km	MPC · JPL
124653	2001 SO_{72}	—	September 17, 2001	Socorro	LINEAR	·	2.7 km	MPC · JPL
124654	2001 SV_{73}	—	September 16, 2001	Palomar	NEAT	·	1.6 km	MPC · JPL
124655	2001 SP_{74}	—	September 19, 2001	Anderson Mesa	LONEOS	·	1.9 km	MPC · JPL
124656	2001 SC_{75}	—	September 19, 2001	Anderson Mesa	LONEOS	·	1.4 km	MPC · JPL
124657	2001 SM_{76}	—	September 16, 2001	Socorro	LINEAR	·	1.5 km	MPC · JPL
124658	2001 SV_{76}	—	September 16, 2001	Socorro	LINEAR	·	2.0 km	MPC · JPL
124659	2001 SO_{80}	—	September 20, 2001	Socorro	LINEAR	·	1.7 km	MPC · JPL
124660	2001 SW_{80}	—	September 20, 2001	Socorro	LINEAR	·	1.4 km	MPC · JPL
124661	2001 SG_{81}	—	September 20, 2001	Socorro	LINEAR	·	1.2 km	MPC · JPL
124662	2001 SD_{84}	—	September 20, 2001	Socorro	LINEAR	V	890 m	MPC · JPL
124663	2001 SP_{85}	—	September 20, 2001	Socorro	LINEAR	·	3.2 km	MPC · JPL
124664	2001 SR_{88}	—	September 20, 2001	Socorro	LINEAR	·	1.4 km	MPC · JPL
124665	2001 SQ_{89}	—	September 20, 2001	Socorro	LINEAR	·	1.0 km	MPC · JPL
124666	2001 SX_{93}	—	September 20, 2001	Socorro	LINEAR	·	2.2 km	MPC · JPL
124667	2001 SU_{98}	—	September 20, 2001	Socorro	LINEAR	NYS	2.2 km	MPC · JPL
124668	2001 SF_{99}	—	September 20, 2001	Socorro	LINEAR	·	1.4 km	MPC · JPL
124669	2001 SP_{101}	—	September 20, 2001	Socorro	LINEAR	·	3.2 km	MPC · JPL
124670	2001 SC_{105}	—	September 20, 2001	Socorro	LINEAR	·	1.7 km	MPC · JPL
124671	2001 SQ_{106}	—	September 20, 2001	Socorro	LINEAR	V	1.5 km	MPC · JPL
124672	2001 SX_{106}	—	September 20, 2001	Socorro	LINEAR	RAF	2.1 km	MPC · JPL
124673	2001 SZ_{106}	—	September 20, 2001	Socorro	LINEAR	·	1.6 km	MPC · JPL
124674	2001 SH_{107}	—	September 20, 2001	Socorro	LINEAR	V	1.9 km	MPC · JPL
124675	2001 SW_{107}	—	September 20, 2001	Socorro	LINEAR	·	2.5 km	MPC · JPL
124676	2001 SY_{107}	—	September 20, 2001	Socorro	LINEAR	·	2.2 km	MPC · JPL
124677	2001 SE_{108}	—	September 20, 2001	Socorro	LINEAR	·	3.3 km	MPC · JPL
124678	2001 SD_{111}	—	September 20, 2001	Socorro	LINEAR	·	3.8 km	MPC · JPL
124679	2001 SS_{111}	—	September 20, 2001	Socorro	LINEAR	·	2.1 km	MPC · JPL
124680	2001 ST_{111}	—	September 20, 2001	Socorro	LINEAR	·	1.8 km	MPC · JPL
124681	2001 ST_{112}	—	September 18, 2001	Desert Eagle	W. K. Y. Yeung	V	2.0 km	MPC · JPL
124682	2001 SC_{113}	—	September 18, 2001	Desert Eagle	W. K. Y. Yeung	·	2.7 km	MPC · JPL
124683	2001 SL_{113}	—	September 20, 2001	Desert Eagle	W. K. Y. Yeung	V	970 m	MPC · JPL
124684	2001 SW_{114}	—	September 20, 2001	Desert Eagle	W. K. Y. Yeung	·	3.1 km	MPC · JPL
124685	2001 SN_{116}	—	September 18, 2001	Desert Eagle	W. K. Y. Yeung	·	1.9 km	MPC · JPL
124686	2001 SD_{118}	—	September 16, 2001	Socorro	LINEAR	·	1.1 km	MPC · JPL
124687	2001 SO_{118}	—	September 16, 2001	Socorro	LINEAR	·	1.1 km	MPC · JPL
124688	2001 SU_{121}	—	September 16, 2001	Socorro	LINEAR	·	3.1 km	MPC · JPL
124689	2001 SA_{122}	—	September 16, 2001	Socorro	LINEAR	·	1.6 km	MPC · JPL
124690	2001 SN_{125}	—	September 16, 2001	Socorro	LINEAR	·	1.3 km	MPC · JPL
124691	2001 SV_{129}	—	September 16, 2001	Socorro	LINEAR	·	1.3 km	MPC · JPL
124692	2001 SX_{130}	—	September 16, 2001	Socorro	LINEAR	NYS	2.1 km	MPC · JPL
124693	2001 SL_{131}	—	September 16, 2001	Socorro	LINEAR	·	1.3 km	MPC · JPL
124694	2001 SN_{134}	—	September 16, 2001	Socorro	LINEAR	V	1.1 km	MPC · JPL
124695	2001 SR_{136}	—	September 16, 2001	Socorro	LINEAR	L5	20 km	MPC · JPL
124696	2001 SC_{137}	—	September 16, 2001	Socorro	LINEAR	L5	10 km	MPC · JPL
124697	2001 SF_{138}	—	September 16, 2001	Socorro	LINEAR	·	1.7 km	MPC · JPL
124698	2001 SL_{140}	—	September 16, 2001	Socorro	LINEAR	NYS	1.5 km	MPC · JPL
124699	2001 SK_{142}	—	September 16, 2001	Socorro	LINEAR	·	1.4 km	MPC · JPL
124700	2001 SZ_{142}	—	September 16, 2001	Socorro	LINEAR	·	1.5 km	MPC · JPL

== 124701–124800 ==
back to top

Designation			Discovery			Properties		Ref
Permanent	Provisional	Named after	Date	Site	Discoverer(s)	Category	Diam.	Ref
124701	2001 SG_{144}	—	September 16, 2001	Socorro	LINEAR	·	2.0 km	MPC · JPL
124702	2001 SE_{146}	—	September 16, 2001	Socorro	LINEAR	·	1.5 km	MPC · JPL
124703	2001 SS_{147}	—	September 17, 2001	Socorro	LINEAR	·	1.4 km	MPC · JPL
124704	2001 SQ_{148}	—	September 17, 2001	Socorro	LINEAR	·	1.3 km	MPC · JPL
124705	2001 SR_{149}	—	September 17, 2001	Socorro	LINEAR	·	3.3 km	MPC · JPL
124706	2001 SS_{149}	—	September 17, 2001	Socorro	LINEAR	·	2.2 km	MPC · JPL
124707	2001 ST_{149}	—	September 17, 2001	Socorro	LINEAR	·	1.9 km	MPC · JPL
124708	2001 SU_{149}	—	September 17, 2001	Socorro	LINEAR	·	1.2 km	MPC · JPL
124709	2001 SA_{150}	—	September 17, 2001	Socorro	LINEAR	ADE	2.4 km	MPC · JPL
124710	2001 SD_{151}	—	September 17, 2001	Socorro	LINEAR	·	3.4 km	MPC · JPL
124711	2001 SF_{151}	—	September 17, 2001	Socorro	LINEAR	·	1.5 km	MPC · JPL
124712	2001 SA_{153}	—	September 17, 2001	Socorro	LINEAR	·	2.1 km	MPC · JPL
124713	2001 SJ_{153}	—	September 17, 2001	Socorro	LINEAR	NYS	1.6 km	MPC · JPL
124714	2001 SA_{155}	—	September 17, 2001	Socorro	LINEAR	·	1.8 km	MPC · JPL
124715	2001 SC_{155}	—	September 17, 2001	Socorro	LINEAR	·	1.8 km	MPC · JPL
124716	2001 SG_{157}	—	September 17, 2001	Socorro	LINEAR	V	1.3 km	MPC · JPL
124717	2001 SG_{158}	—	September 17, 2001	Socorro	LINEAR	·	1.1 km	MPC · JPL
124718	2001 SA_{160}	—	September 17, 2001	Socorro	LINEAR	·	2.6 km	MPC · JPL
124719	2001 SH_{160}	—	September 17, 2001	Socorro	LINEAR	·	1.9 km	MPC · JPL
124720	2001 SZ_{161}	—	September 17, 2001	Socorro	LINEAR	NYS	1.6 km	MPC · JPL
124721	2001 SW_{163}	—	September 17, 2001	Socorro	LINEAR	·	2.2 km	MPC · JPL
124722	2001 SG_{164}	—	September 17, 2001	Socorro	LINEAR	·	1.5 km	MPC · JPL
124723	2001 SW_{164}	—	September 17, 2001	Socorro	LINEAR	·	1.8 km	MPC · JPL
124724	2001 SE_{165}	—	September 17, 2001	Socorro	LINEAR	·	1.5 km	MPC · JPL
124725	2001 SR_{167}	—	September 19, 2001	Socorro	LINEAR	·	2.7 km	MPC · JPL
124726	2001 SU_{168}	—	September 19, 2001	Socorro	LINEAR	V	1.1 km	MPC · JPL
124727	2001 SG_{169}	—	September 19, 2001	Socorro	LINEAR	·	2.2 km	MPC · JPL
124728	2001 SR_{171}	—	September 16, 2001	Socorro	LINEAR	·	1.5 km	MPC · JPL
124729	2001 SB_{173}	—	September 16, 2001	Socorro	LINEAR	L5	10 km	MPC · JPL
124730	2001 SV_{173}	—	September 16, 2001	Socorro	LINEAR	·	1.7 km	MPC · JPL
124731	2001 SJ_{177}	—	September 16, 2001	Socorro	LINEAR	·	1.5 km	MPC · JPL
124732	2001 SY_{178}	—	September 17, 2001	Socorro	LINEAR	·	1.3 km	MPC · JPL
124733	2001 SG_{179}	—	September 17, 2001	Socorro	LINEAR	·	1.4 km	MPC · JPL
124734	2001 SP_{179}	—	September 17, 2001	Socorro	LINEAR	·	2.2 km	MPC · JPL
124735	2001 SB_{183}	—	September 19, 2001	Socorro	LINEAR	MAS	1.3 km	MPC · JPL
124736	2001 SK_{183}	—	September 19, 2001	Socorro	LINEAR	EUN	2.4 km	MPC · JPL
124737	2001 SW_{183}	—	September 19, 2001	Socorro	LINEAR	·	2.9 km	MPC · JPL
124738	2001 SF_{199}	—	September 19, 2001	Socorro	LINEAR	MAS	1.3 km	MPC · JPL
124739	2001 SE_{201}	—	September 19, 2001	Socorro	LINEAR	·	2.1 km	MPC · JPL
124740	2001 SK_{204}	—	September 19, 2001	Socorro	LINEAR	·	1.5 km	MPC · JPL
124741	2001 SL_{206}	—	September 19, 2001	Socorro	LINEAR	·	1.1 km	MPC · JPL
124742	2001 SV_{207}	—	September 19, 2001	Socorro	LINEAR	·	1.3 km	MPC · JPL
124743	2001 SY_{207}	—	September 19, 2001	Socorro	LINEAR	·	1.1 km	MPC · JPL
124744	2001 SB_{210}	—	September 19, 2001	Socorro	LINEAR	·	1.3 km	MPC · JPL
124745	2001 SF_{210}	—	September 19, 2001	Socorro	LINEAR	NYS	2.2 km	MPC · JPL
124746	2001 SN_{211}	—	September 19, 2001	Socorro	LINEAR	·	1.2 km	MPC · JPL
124747	2001 SP_{211}	—	September 19, 2001	Socorro	LINEAR	NYS	1.6 km	MPC · JPL
124748	2001 SQ_{212}	—	September 19, 2001	Socorro	LINEAR	·	1.3 km	MPC · JPL
124749	2001 SD_{215}	—	September 19, 2001	Socorro	LINEAR	·	1.3 km	MPC · JPL
124750	2001 SO_{215}	—	September 19, 2001	Socorro	LINEAR	·	2.2 km	MPC · JPL
124751	2001 SR_{217}	—	September 19, 2001	Socorro	LINEAR	EUN	2.0 km	MPC · JPL
124752	2001 SB_{220}	—	September 19, 2001	Socorro	LINEAR	·	1.5 km	MPC · JPL
124753	2001 SK_{220}	—	September 19, 2001	Socorro	LINEAR	·	1.9 km	MPC · JPL
124754	2001 SK_{222}	—	September 19, 2001	Socorro	LINEAR	·	5.5 km	MPC · JPL
124755	2001 SU_{222}	—	September 19, 2001	Socorro	LINEAR	·	1.3 km	MPC · JPL
124756	2001 SM_{225}	—	September 19, 2001	Socorro	LINEAR	NYS	3.3 km	MPC · JPL
124757	2001 SU_{225}	—	September 19, 2001	Socorro	LINEAR	NYS	1.9 km	MPC · JPL
124758	2001 SH_{227}	—	September 19, 2001	Socorro	LINEAR	·	1.1 km	MPC · JPL
124759	2001 SP_{228}	—	September 19, 2001	Socorro	LINEAR	MAS	1.6 km	MPC · JPL
124760	2001 SQ_{228}	—	September 19, 2001	Socorro	LINEAR	V	1.1 km	MPC · JPL
124761	2001 ST_{230}	—	September 19, 2001	Socorro	LINEAR	·	1.4 km	MPC · JPL
124762	2001 SE_{233}	—	September 19, 2001	Socorro	LINEAR	MAS	1.8 km	MPC · JPL
124763	2001 SW_{234}	—	September 19, 2001	Socorro	LINEAR	·	1.4 km	MPC · JPL
124764	2001 SE_{235}	—	September 19, 2001	Socorro	LINEAR	·	1.9 km	MPC · JPL
124765	2001 SO_{238}	—	September 19, 2001	Socorro	LINEAR	·	2.6 km	MPC · JPL
124766	2001 SV_{239}	—	September 19, 2001	Socorro	LINEAR	·	1.7 km	MPC · JPL
124767	2001 SO_{240}	—	September 19, 2001	Socorro	LINEAR	·	2.5 km	MPC · JPL
124768	2001 SB_{243}	—	September 19, 2001	Socorro	LINEAR	MAS	1.3 km	MPC · JPL
124769	2001 SJ_{244}	—	September 19, 2001	Socorro	LINEAR	·	2.5 km	MPC · JPL
124770	2001 SP_{244}	—	September 19, 2001	Socorro	LINEAR	·	2.3 km	MPC · JPL
124771	2001 SR_{244}	—	September 19, 2001	Socorro	LINEAR	MAS	1.1 km	MPC · JPL
124772	2001 SL_{245}	—	September 19, 2001	Socorro	LINEAR	MAS	1.5 km	MPC · JPL
124773	2001 SB_{246}	—	September 19, 2001	Socorro	LINEAR	·	1.0 km	MPC · JPL
124774	2001 SG_{247}	—	September 19, 2001	Socorro	LINEAR	·	920 m	MPC · JPL
124775	2001 SJ_{247}	—	September 19, 2001	Socorro	LINEAR	·	1.8 km	MPC · JPL
124776	2001 SY_{247}	—	September 19, 2001	Socorro	LINEAR	·	1.6 km	MPC · JPL
124777	2001 SO_{248}	—	September 19, 2001	Socorro	LINEAR	·	1.4 km	MPC · JPL
124778	2001 SE_{249}	—	September 19, 2001	Socorro	LINEAR	MAS	1.2 km	MPC · JPL
124779	2001 SH_{250}	—	September 19, 2001	Socorro	LINEAR	·	2.6 km	MPC · JPL
124780	2001 SR_{250}	—	September 19, 2001	Socorro	LINEAR	·	910 m	MPC · JPL
124781	2001 SS_{252}	—	September 19, 2001	Socorro	LINEAR	·	1.5 km	MPC · JPL
124782	2001 SU_{253}	—	September 19, 2001	Socorro	LINEAR	·	1.8 km	MPC · JPL
124783	2001 SA_{254}	—	September 19, 2001	Socorro	LINEAR	·	4.0 km	MPC · JPL
124784	2001 ST_{254}	—	September 19, 2001	Socorro	LINEAR	·	1.6 km	MPC · JPL
124785	2001 SX_{254}	—	September 19, 2001	Socorro	LINEAR	·	2.7 km	MPC · JPL
124786	2001 SC_{256}	—	September 19, 2001	Socorro	LINEAR	·	1.8 km	MPC · JPL
124787	2001 SO_{256}	—	September 19, 2001	Socorro	LINEAR	MAS	1.4 km	MPC · JPL
124788	2001 SP_{256}	—	September 19, 2001	Socorro	LINEAR	·	2.5 km	MPC · JPL
124789	2001 SS_{256}	—	September 19, 2001	Socorro	LINEAR	·	2.8 km	MPC · JPL
124790	2001 SV_{257}	—	September 20, 2001	Socorro	LINEAR	·	1.0 km	MPC · JPL
124791	2001 SP_{261}	—	September 20, 2001	Socorro	LINEAR	3:2 · SHU	12 km	MPC · JPL
124792	2001 SE_{262}	—	September 21, 2001	Socorro	LINEAR	·	2.2 km	MPC · JPL
124793	2001 SY_{265}	—	September 25, 2001	Desert Eagle	W. K. Y. Yeung	NYS	1.8 km	MPC · JPL
124794	2001 SC_{266}	—	September 25, 2001	Desert Eagle	W. K. Y. Yeung	·	2.0 km	MPC · JPL
124795	2001 SN_{266}	—	September 25, 2001	Desert Eagle	W. K. Y. Yeung	MAS	1.2 km	MPC · JPL
124796	2001 SC_{267}	—	September 25, 2001	Desert Eagle	W. K. Y. Yeung	·	2.8 km	MPC · JPL
124797	2001 SX_{267}	—	September 25, 2001	Desert Eagle	W. K. Y. Yeung	·	4.2 km	MPC · JPL
124798	2001 SZ_{267}	—	September 25, 2001	Desert Eagle	W. K. Y. Yeung	·	1.3 km	MPC · JPL
124799	2001 SX_{271}	—	September 20, 2001	Socorro	LINEAR	·	2.1 km	MPC · JPL
124800	2001 SJ_{272}	—	September 21, 2001	Socorro	LINEAR	NYS	1.6 km	MPC · JPL

== 124801–124900 ==
back to top

Designation			Discovery			Properties		Ref
Permanent	Provisional	Named after	Date	Site	Discoverer(s)	Category	Diam.	Ref
124801	2001 SF_{277}	—	September 26, 2001	Socorro	LINEAR	PHO	1.7 km	MPC · JPL
124802	2001 SO_{278}	—	September 21, 2001	Anderson Mesa	LONEOS	fast	2.2 km	MPC · JPL
124803	2001 SR_{278}	—	September 21, 2001	Anderson Mesa	LONEOS	·	1.6 km	MPC · JPL
124804	2001 SX_{278}	—	September 21, 2001	Anderson Mesa	LONEOS	·	1.1 km	MPC · JPL
124805	2001 SY_{278}	—	September 21, 2001	Anderson Mesa	LONEOS	·	1.6 km	MPC · JPL
124806	2001 SL_{279}	—	September 21, 2001	Anderson Mesa	LONEOS	NYS	1.6 km	MPC · JPL
124807	2001 SM_{279}	—	September 21, 2001	Anderson Mesa	LONEOS	NYS	2.1 km	MPC · JPL
124808	2001 SH_{280}	—	September 21, 2001	Anderson Mesa	LONEOS	MAS	1.6 km	MPC · JPL
124809	2001 SR_{280}	—	September 21, 2001	Anderson Mesa	LONEOS	·	1.8 km	MPC · JPL
124810	2001 SS_{282}	—	September 21, 2001	Socorro	LINEAR	·	2.2 km	MPC · JPL
124811	2001 ST_{282}	—	September 22, 2001	Socorro	LINEAR	·	3.6 km	MPC · JPL
124812	2001 SB_{284}	—	September 22, 2001	Kitt Peak	Spacewatch	PHO	1.4 km	MPC · JPL
124813	2001 SD_{285}	—	September 22, 2001	Kitt Peak	Spacewatch	·	1.5 km	MPC · JPL
124814	2001 SF_{285}	—	September 22, 2001	Kitt Peak	Spacewatch	·	1.2 km	MPC · JPL
124815	2001 SH_{287}	—	September 22, 2001	Palomar	NEAT	EUN	3.4 km	MPC · JPL
124816	2001 SV_{288}	—	September 28, 2001	Palomar	NEAT	·	1.4 km	MPC · JPL
124817	2001 SV_{290}	—	September 16, 2001	Socorro	LINEAR	·	2.1 km	MPC · JPL
124818	2001 SL_{292}	—	September 16, 2001	Socorro	LINEAR	·	1.8 km	MPC · JPL
124819	2001 SY_{294}	—	September 20, 2001	Socorro	LINEAR	·	1.1 km	MPC · JPL
124820	2001 SM_{307}	—	September 21, 2001	Socorro	LINEAR	MAS	1.3 km	MPC · JPL
124821	2001 SE_{308}	—	September 21, 2001	Socorro	LINEAR	·	2.0 km	MPC · JPL
124822	2001 SQ_{308}	—	September 22, 2001	Socorro	LINEAR	·	1.1 km	MPC · JPL
124823	2001 SO_{311}	—	September 20, 2001	Socorro	LINEAR	V	1.2 km	MPC · JPL
124824	2001 SJ_{312}	—	September 21, 2001	Socorro	LINEAR	·	1.3 km	MPC · JPL
124825	2001 SS_{313}	—	September 21, 2001	Socorro	LINEAR	·	2.3 km	MPC · JPL
124826	2001 SH_{315}	—	September 25, 2001	Socorro	LINEAR	V	1.4 km	MPC · JPL
124827	2001 SQ_{319}	—	September 21, 2001	Socorro	LINEAR	·	2.1 km	MPC · JPL
124828	2001 SS_{324}	—	September 16, 2001	Socorro	LINEAR	·	1.9 km	MPC · JPL
124829	2001 SA_{326}	—	September 17, 2001	Anderson Mesa	LONEOS	(2076)	1.2 km	MPC · JPL
124830	2001 SG_{327}	—	September 18, 2001	Anderson Mesa	LONEOS	·	2.0 km	MPC · JPL
124831	2001 SV_{327}	—	September 18, 2001	Anderson Mesa	LONEOS	·	1.2 km	MPC · JPL
124832	2001 SQ_{332}	—	September 19, 2001	Palomar	NEAT	V	1.1 km	MPC · JPL
124833	2001 SF_{350}	—	September 20, 2001	Socorro	LINEAR	·	940 m	MPC · JPL
124834	2001 TH	—	October 8, 2001	Socorro	LINEAR	PHO	1.8 km	MPC · JPL
124835	2001 TX_{3}	—	October 7, 2001	Palomar	NEAT	·	1.2 km	MPC · JPL
124836	2001 TE_{4}	—	October 7, 2001	Palomar	NEAT	·	1.9 km	MPC · JPL
124837	2001 TF_{5}	—	October 10, 2001	Palomar	NEAT	·	1.1 km	MPC · JPL
124838	2001 TS_{5}	—	October 10, 2001	Palomar	NEAT	·	1.2 km	MPC · JPL
124839	2001 TX_{5}	—	October 10, 2001	Palomar	NEAT	·	2.4 km	MPC · JPL
124840	2001 TR_{6}	—	October 10, 2001	Palomar	NEAT	·	1.6 km	MPC · JPL
124841	2001 TH_{8}	—	October 9, 2001	Socorro	LINEAR	·	2.0 km	MPC · JPL
124842	2001 TD_{9}	—	October 9, 2001	Socorro	LINEAR	V	1.2 km	MPC · JPL
124843	2001 TT_{11}	—	October 13, 2001	Socorro	LINEAR	·	1.5 km	MPC · JPL
124844 Hirotamasao	2001 TF_{15}	Hirotamasao	October 13, 2001	Shishikui	Maeno, H.	NYS	1.7 km	MPC · JPL
124845 Clinteastwood	2001 TH_{15}	Clinteastwood	October 12, 2001	Goodricke-Pigott	R. A. Tucker	·	1.3 km	MPC · JPL
124846	2001 TN_{15}	—	October 11, 2001	Socorro	LINEAR	·	2.8 km	MPC · JPL
124847	2001 TX_{15}	—	October 11, 2001	Socorro	LINEAR	V	1.5 km	MPC · JPL
124848	2001 TZ_{15}	—	October 11, 2001	Socorro	LINEAR	·	1.9 km	MPC · JPL
124849	2001 TN_{16}	—	October 11, 2001	Socorro	LINEAR	PHO	1.7 km	MPC · JPL
124850	2001 TW_{17}	—	October 14, 2001	Desert Eagle	W. K. Y. Yeung	·	2.2 km	MPC · JPL
124851	2001 TH_{18}	—	October 14, 2001	Desert Eagle	W. K. Y. Yeung	(2076)	1.3 km	MPC · JPL
124852 Cooper	2001 TB_{19}	Cooper	October 14, 2001	Needville	J. Dellinger, W. G. Dillon	PHO	3.3 km	MPC · JPL
124853	2001 TO_{19}	—	October 9, 2001	Socorro	LINEAR	·	1.4 km	MPC · JPL
124854	2001 TD_{20}	—	October 9, 2001	Socorro	LINEAR	·	3.1 km	MPC · JPL
124855	2001 TU_{20}	—	October 9, 2001	Socorro	LINEAR	PHO	2.1 km	MPC · JPL
124856	2001 TS_{22}	—	October 13, 2001	Socorro	LINEAR	NYS	1.7 km	MPC · JPL
124857	2001 TL_{24}	—	October 14, 2001	Socorro	LINEAR	·	1.9 km	MPC · JPL
124858	2001 TX_{24}	—	October 14, 2001	Socorro	LINEAR	·	1.6 km	MPC · JPL
124859	2001 TA_{25}	—	October 14, 2001	Socorro	LINEAR	ERI	3.1 km	MPC · JPL
124860	2001 TQ_{25}	—	October 14, 2001	Socorro	LINEAR	·	1.6 km	MPC · JPL
124861	2001 TB_{28}	—	October 14, 2001	Socorro	LINEAR	·	1.8 km	MPC · JPL
124862	2001 TG_{28}	—	October 14, 2001	Socorro	LINEAR	·	1.4 km	MPC · JPL
124863	2001 TU_{28}	—	October 14, 2001	Socorro	LINEAR	·	2.0 km	MPC · JPL
124864	2001 TH_{29}	—	October 14, 2001	Socorro	LINEAR	·	2.8 km	MPC · JPL
124865	2001 TJ_{29}	—	October 14, 2001	Socorro	LINEAR	·	1.1 km	MPC · JPL
124866	2001 TM_{30}	—	October 14, 2001	Socorro	LINEAR	·	2.5 km	MPC · JPL
124867	2001 TF_{31}	—	October 14, 2001	Socorro	LINEAR	(2076)	1.4 km	MPC · JPL
124868	2001 TL_{33}	—	October 14, 2001	Socorro	LINEAR	·	2.8 km	MPC · JPL
124869	2001 TZ_{33}	—	October 14, 2001	Socorro	LINEAR	·	1.6 km	MPC · JPL
124870	2001 TH_{34}	—	October 14, 2001	Socorro	LINEAR	·	3.3 km	MPC · JPL
124871	2001 TR_{34}	—	October 14, 2001	Socorro	LINEAR	·	1.9 km	MPC · JPL
124872	2001 TU_{34}	—	October 14, 2001	Socorro	LINEAR	·	2.4 km	MPC · JPL
124873	2001 TG_{35}	—	October 14, 2001	Socorro	LINEAR	·	2.4 km	MPC · JPL
124874	2001 TU_{35}	—	October 14, 2001	Socorro	LINEAR	·	2.6 km	MPC · JPL
124875	2001 TY_{35}	—	October 14, 2001	Socorro	LINEAR	V	1.5 km	MPC · JPL
124876	2001 TK_{36}	—	October 14, 2001	Socorro	LINEAR	(2076)	1.7 km	MPC · JPL
124877	2001 TL_{37}	—	October 14, 2001	Socorro	LINEAR	·	2.8 km	MPC · JPL
124878	2001 TC_{38}	—	October 14, 2001	Socorro	LINEAR	·	2.2 km	MPC · JPL
124879	2001 TX_{38}	—	October 14, 2001	Socorro	LINEAR	V	1.5 km	MPC · JPL
124880	2001 TZ_{38}	—	October 14, 2001	Socorro	LINEAR	·	1.9 km	MPC · JPL
124881	2001 TP_{39}	—	October 14, 2001	Socorro	LINEAR	PHO	4.6 km	MPC · JPL
124882	2001 TV_{39}	—	October 14, 2001	Socorro	LINEAR	·	5.2 km	MPC · JPL
124883	2001 TX_{39}	—	October 14, 2001	Socorro	LINEAR	·	2.2 km	MPC · JPL
124884	2001 TE_{41}	—	October 14, 2001	Socorro	LINEAR	·	2.1 km	MPC · JPL
124885	2001 TT_{42}	—	October 14, 2001	Socorro	LINEAR	·	1.9 km	MPC · JPL
124886	2001 TQ_{44}	—	October 14, 2001	Socorro	LINEAR	·	4.6 km	MPC · JPL
124887	2001 TH_{45}	—	October 14, 2001	Desert Eagle	W. K. Y. Yeung	·	1.7 km	MPC · JPL
124888	2001 TP_{45}	—	October 14, 2001	Desert Eagle	W. K. Y. Yeung	·	1.9 km	MPC · JPL
124889	2001 TT_{46}	—	October 14, 2001	Desert Eagle	W. K. Y. Yeung	·	3.1 km	MPC · JPL
124890	2001 TU_{46}	—	October 15, 2001	Desert Eagle	W. K. Y. Yeung	(2076)	1.4 km	MPC · JPL
124891	2001 TE_{47}	—	October 14, 2001	Cima Ekar	ADAS	·	1.7 km	MPC · JPL
124892	2001 TN_{48}	—	October 11, 2001	Palomar	NEAT	·	1.2 km	MPC · JPL
124893	2001 TM_{49}	—	October 15, 2001	Desert Eagle	W. K. Y. Yeung	·	3.0 km	MPC · JPL
124894	2001 TN_{49}	—	October 15, 2001	Desert Eagle	W. K. Y. Yeung	·	1.6 km	MPC · JPL
124895	2001 TJ_{50}	—	October 13, 2001	Socorro	LINEAR	·	1.3 km	MPC · JPL
124896	2001 TL_{50}	—	October 13, 2001	Socorro	LINEAR	·	3.3 km	MPC · JPL
124897	2001 TW_{50}	—	October 13, 2001	Socorro	LINEAR	·	1.3 km	MPC · JPL
124898	2001 TX_{50}	—	October 13, 2001	Socorro	LINEAR	·	2.1 km	MPC · JPL
124899	2001 TH_{51}	—	October 13, 2001	Socorro	LINEAR	·	2.4 km	MPC · JPL
124900	2001 TS_{51}	—	October 13, 2001	Socorro	LINEAR	·	2.2 km	MPC · JPL

== 124901–125000 ==
back to top

Designation			Discovery			Properties		Ref
Permanent	Provisional	Named after	Date	Site	Discoverer(s)	Category	Diam.	Ref
124901	2001 TE_{52}	—	October 13, 2001	Socorro	LINEAR	·	3.6 km	MPC · JPL
124902	2001 TP_{52}	—	October 13, 2001	Socorro	LINEAR	·	1.2 km	MPC · JPL
124903	2001 TU_{52}	—	October 13, 2001	Socorro	LINEAR	·	1.1 km	MPC · JPL
124904	2001 TV_{53}	—	October 13, 2001	Socorro	LINEAR	NYS	4.2 km	MPC · JPL
124905	2001 TB_{59}	—	October 13, 2001	Socorro	LINEAR	·	3.7 km	MPC · JPL
124906	2001 TQ_{59}	—	October 13, 2001	Socorro	LINEAR	·	1.8 km	MPC · JPL
124907	2001 TV_{59}	—	October 13, 2001	Socorro	LINEAR	·	2.5 km	MPC · JPL
124908	2001 TW_{59}	—	October 13, 2001	Socorro	LINEAR	·	1.5 km	MPC · JPL
124909	2001 TX_{59}	—	October 13, 2001	Socorro	LINEAR	·	970 m	MPC · JPL
124910	2001 TR_{60}	—	October 13, 2001	Socorro	LINEAR	·	3.5 km	MPC · JPL
124911	2001 TZ_{61}	—	October 13, 2001	Socorro	LINEAR	NYS	3.2 km	MPC · JPL
124912	2001 TA_{63}	—	October 13, 2001	Socorro	LINEAR	MAS	1.1 km	MPC · JPL
124913	2001 TF_{63}	—	October 13, 2001	Socorro	LINEAR	·	1.6 km	MPC · JPL
124914	2001 TD_{64}	—	October 13, 2001	Socorro	LINEAR	·	2.0 km	MPC · JPL
124915	2001 TZ_{64}	—	October 13, 2001	Socorro	LINEAR	·	1.3 km	MPC · JPL
124916	2001 TO_{65}	—	October 13, 2001	Socorro	LINEAR	NYS	2.3 km	MPC · JPL
124917	2001 TJ_{66}	—	October 13, 2001	Socorro	LINEAR	·	1.8 km	MPC · JPL
124918	2001 TK_{66}	—	October 13, 2001	Socorro	LINEAR	NYS	2.1 km	MPC · JPL
124919	2001 TL_{66}	—	October 13, 2001	Socorro	LINEAR	(2076)	1.5 km	MPC · JPL
124920	2001 TU_{67}	—	October 13, 2001	Socorro	LINEAR	·	2.9 km	MPC · JPL
124921	2001 TO_{69}	—	October 13, 2001	Socorro	LINEAR	·	1.4 km	MPC · JPL
124922	2001 TQ_{69}	—	October 13, 2001	Socorro	LINEAR	·	1.2 km	MPC · JPL
124923	2001 TU_{69}	—	October 13, 2001	Socorro	LINEAR	·	840 m	MPC · JPL
124924	2001 TE_{70}	—	October 13, 2001	Socorro	LINEAR	·	1.3 km	MPC · JPL
124925	2001 TK_{70}	—	October 13, 2001	Socorro	LINEAR	·	2.4 km	MPC · JPL
124926	2001 TO_{70}	—	October 13, 2001	Socorro	LINEAR	·	6.8 km	MPC · JPL
124927	2001 TH_{71}	—	October 13, 2001	Socorro	LINEAR	·	2.0 km	MPC · JPL
124928	2001 TR_{71}	—	October 13, 2001	Socorro	LINEAR	·	1.2 km	MPC · JPL
124929	2001 TU_{71}	—	October 13, 2001	Socorro	LINEAR	·	2.2 km	MPC · JPL
124930	2001 TY_{71}	—	October 13, 2001	Socorro	LINEAR	·	2.6 km	MPC · JPL
124931	2001 TE_{72}	—	October 13, 2001	Socorro	LINEAR	·	1.1 km	MPC · JPL
124932	2001 TA_{74}	—	October 13, 2001	Socorro	LINEAR	slow	1.7 km	MPC · JPL
124933	2001 TP_{75}	—	October 13, 2001	Socorro	LINEAR	V	1.4 km	MPC · JPL
124934	2001 TA_{76}	—	October 13, 2001	Socorro	LINEAR	MAS	1.4 km	MPC · JPL
124935	2001 TQ_{76}	—	October 13, 2001	Socorro	LINEAR	NYS	2.4 km	MPC · JPL
124936	2001 TV_{77}	—	October 13, 2001	Socorro	LINEAR	·	2.3 km	MPC · JPL
124937	2001 TO_{78}	—	October 13, 2001	Socorro	LINEAR	·	1.8 km	MPC · JPL
124938	2001 TU_{78}	—	October 13, 2001	Socorro	LINEAR	·	3.5 km	MPC · JPL
124939	2001 TA_{79}	—	October 13, 2001	Socorro	LINEAR	·	2.1 km	MPC · JPL
124940	2001 TP_{79}	—	October 13, 2001	Socorro	LINEAR	·	2.9 km	MPC · JPL
124941	2001 TR_{79}	—	October 13, 2001	Socorro	LINEAR	·	1.5 km	MPC · JPL
124942	2001 TV_{79}	—	October 13, 2001	Socorro	LINEAR	·	980 m	MPC · JPL
124943	2001 TW_{79}	—	October 13, 2001	Socorro	LINEAR	·	1.5 km	MPC · JPL
124944	2001 TZ_{81}	—	October 14, 2001	Socorro	LINEAR	·	3.1 km	MPC · JPL
124945	2001 TM_{82}	—	October 14, 2001	Socorro	LINEAR	·	1.8 km	MPC · JPL
124946	2001 TG_{83}	—	October 14, 2001	Socorro	LINEAR	·	2.3 km	MPC · JPL
124947	2001 TY_{83}	—	October 14, 2001	Socorro	LINEAR	·	1.3 km	MPC · JPL
124948	2001 TV_{85}	—	October 14, 2001	Socorro	LINEAR	·	1.8 km	MPC · JPL
124949	2001 TO_{86}	—	October 14, 2001	Socorro	LINEAR	(1338) (FLO)	1.0 km	MPC · JPL
124950	2001 TM_{87}	—	October 14, 2001	Socorro	LINEAR	·	1.4 km	MPC · JPL
124951	2001 TK_{88}	—	October 14, 2001	Socorro	LINEAR	·	1.6 km	MPC · JPL
124952	2001 TF_{89}	—	October 14, 2001	Socorro	LINEAR	V	1.3 km	MPC · JPL
124953	2001 TH_{90}	—	October 14, 2001	Socorro	LINEAR	·	2.1 km	MPC · JPL
124954	2001 TX_{91}	—	October 14, 2001	Socorro	LINEAR	·	3.3 km	MPC · JPL
124955	2001 TC_{92}	—	October 14, 2001	Socorro	LINEAR	·	1.8 km	MPC · JPL
124956	2001 TR_{92}	—	October 14, 2001	Socorro	LINEAR	·	1.0 km	MPC · JPL
124957	2001 TU_{92}	—	October 14, 2001	Socorro	LINEAR	·	1.3 km	MPC · JPL
124958	2001 TP_{94}	—	October 14, 2001	Socorro	LINEAR	·	1.3 km	MPC · JPL
124959	2001 TA_{96}	—	October 14, 2001	Socorro	LINEAR	·	1.3 km	MPC · JPL
124960	2001 TN_{97}	—	October 14, 2001	Socorro	LINEAR	·	2.5 km	MPC · JPL
124961	2001 TZ_{99}	—	October 14, 2001	Socorro	LINEAR	·	2.2 km	MPC · JPL
124962	2001 TU_{100}	—	October 14, 2001	Socorro	LINEAR	·	1.7 km	MPC · JPL
124963	2001 TV_{101}	—	October 15, 2001	Socorro	LINEAR	·	1.8 km	MPC · JPL
124964	2001 TV_{103}	—	October 15, 2001	Desert Eagle	W. K. Y. Yeung	·	1.1 km	MPC · JPL
124965	2001 TF_{104}	—	October 15, 2001	Desert Eagle	W. K. Y. Yeung	·	2.8 km	MPC · JPL
124966	2001 TH_{105}	—	October 13, 2001	Socorro	LINEAR	NYS	2.5 km	MPC · JPL
124967	2001 TP_{105}	—	October 13, 2001	Socorro	LINEAR	·	3.0 km	MPC · JPL
124968	2001 TS_{105}	—	October 13, 2001	Socorro	LINEAR	·	2.1 km	MPC · JPL
124969	2001 TW_{105}	—	October 13, 2001	Socorro	LINEAR	·	2.6 km	MPC · JPL
124970	2001 TG_{108}	—	October 14, 2001	Socorro	LINEAR	V	1.2 km	MPC · JPL
124971	2001 TJ_{109}	—	October 14, 2001	Socorro	LINEAR	V	2.2 km	MPC · JPL
124972	2001 TO_{110}	—	October 14, 2001	Socorro	LINEAR	·	1.8 km	MPC · JPL
124973	2001 TQ_{110}	—	October 14, 2001	Socorro	LINEAR	·	1.9 km	MPC · JPL
124974	2001 TR_{111}	—	October 14, 2001	Socorro	LINEAR	·	1.5 km	MPC · JPL
124975	2001 TJ_{113}	—	October 14, 2001	Socorro	LINEAR	·	4.1 km	MPC · JPL
124976	2001 TQ_{113}	—	October 14, 2001	Socorro	LINEAR	·	1.8 km	MPC · JPL
124977	2001 TS_{113}	—	October 14, 2001	Socorro	LINEAR	·	2.1 km	MPC · JPL
124978	2001 TE_{114}	—	October 14, 2001	Socorro	LINEAR	V	1.3 km	MPC · JPL
124979	2001 TD_{120}	—	October 15, 2001	Socorro	LINEAR	·	2.7 km	MPC · JPL
124980	2001 TV_{122}	—	October 15, 2001	Socorro	LINEAR	·	1.6 km	MPC · JPL
124981	2001 TX_{126}	—	October 13, 2001	Kitt Peak	Spacewatch	·	910 m	MPC · JPL
124982	2001 TC_{130}	—	October 15, 2001	Kitt Peak	Spacewatch	MAS	1.3 km	MPC · JPL
124983	2001 TX_{130}	—	October 10, 2001	Palomar	NEAT	·	1.7 km	MPC · JPL
124984	2001 TH_{131}	—	October 10, 2001	Palomar	NEAT	V	1.2 km	MPC · JPL
124985	2001 TK_{131}	—	October 10, 2001	Palomar	NEAT	L5	19 km	MPC · JPL
124986	2001 TP_{132}	—	October 12, 2001	Haleakala	NEAT	·	1.8 km	MPC · JPL
124987	2001 TO_{133}	—	October 12, 2001	Haleakala	NEAT	·	3.0 km	MPC · JPL
124988	2001 TF_{138}	—	October 10, 2001	Palomar	NEAT	·	1.3 km	MPC · JPL
124989	2001 TB_{139}	—	October 10, 2001	Palomar	NEAT	·	3.3 km	MPC · JPL
124990	2001 TT_{142}	—	October 10, 2001	Palomar	NEAT	·	1.3 km	MPC · JPL
124991	2001 TY_{143}	—	October 10, 2001	Palomar	NEAT	·	1.2 km	MPC · JPL
124992	2001 TP_{144}	—	October 10, 2001	Palomar	NEAT	·	1.4 km	MPC · JPL
124993	2001 TR_{144}	—	October 10, 2001	Palomar	NEAT	·	1.9 km	MPC · JPL
124994	2001 TL_{145}	—	October 10, 2001	Palomar	NEAT	·	3.5 km	MPC · JPL
124995	2001 TS_{145}	—	October 10, 2001	Palomar	NEAT	V	1.2 km	MPC · JPL
124996	2001 TJ_{146}	—	October 10, 2001	Palomar	NEAT	·	1.2 km	MPC · JPL
124997	2001 TR_{146}	—	October 10, 2001	Palomar	NEAT	·	2.2 km	MPC · JPL
124998	2001 TS_{147}	—	October 10, 2001	Palomar	NEAT	·	1.7 km	MPC · JPL
124999	2001 TS_{150}	—	October 10, 2001	Palomar	NEAT	ERI · slow	2.5 km	MPC · JPL
125000	2001 TA_{153}	—	October 10, 2001	Palomar	NEAT	·	1.3 km	MPC · JPL

back to top

== See also ==
- Meanings of minor-planet names: 124001–125000
