= Meanings of minor-planet names: 124001–125000 =

As minor planet discoveries are confirmed, they are given a permanent number by the IAU's Minor Planet Center (MPC), and the discoverers can then submit names for them, following the IAU's naming conventions. The list below concerns those minor planets in the specified number-range that have received names, and explains the meanings of those names.

Official naming citations of newly named small Solar System bodies are approved and published in a bulletin by IAU's Working Group for Small Bodies Nomenclature (WGSBN). Before May 2021, citations were published in MPC's Minor Planet Circulars for many decades. Recent citations can also be found on the JPL Small-Body Database (SBDB). Until his death in 2016, German astronomer Lutz D. Schmadel compiled these citations into the Dictionary of Minor Planet Names (DMP) and regularly updated the collection.

Based on Paul Herget's The Names of the Minor Planets, Schmadel also researched the unclear origin of numerous asteroids, most of which had been named prior to World War II. This article incorporates text from this source, which is in the public domain: SBDB New namings may only be added to this list below after official publication as the preannouncement of names is condemned. The WGSBN publishes a comprehensive guideline for the naming rules of non-cometary small Solar System bodies.

== 124001–124100 ==
Named minor planet	Provisional	This minor planet was named for...	Ref · Catalog
124075 Ketelsen	2001 GT_{1}	Dean Ketelsen (born 1953), American optician and amateur astronomer	JPL · 124075

== 124101–124200 ==
back to top

Named minor planet	Provisional	This minor planet was named for...	Ref · Catalog
124104 Balcony	2001 HJ_{46}	Francis Faux (born 1959), a French amateur astronomer known by his nickname "Balcony"	JPL · 124104
124114 Bergersen	2001 HX_{65}	Thomas Jacob Bergersen (born 1980) is a prolific composer, having scored over one thousand movie soundtracks and film trailers. His music typically has an epic quality.	IAU · 124114
124143 Joséluiscorral	2001 ME_{5}	José Luis Corral Berruezo (born 1967) worked from 1999 until 2014 as a chef at the Spanish Calar Alto Observatory. Through his culinary skills he contributed significantly to the well-being of his colleagues, visiting astronomers, and the discoverers of this asteroid. He and his food are dearly missed.	JPL · 124143
124192 Moletai	2001 OM_{65}	The Lithuanian town of Molėtai, home of the Molėtai Astronomical Observatory	JPL · 124192

== 124201–124300 ==
back to top

Named minor planet	Provisional	This minor planet was named for...	Ref · Catalog
There are no named minor planets in this number range

== 124301–124400 ==
back to top

Named minor planet	Provisional	This minor planet was named for...	Ref · Catalog
124368 Nickphoenix	2001 QT_{142}	Nick Phoenix (born 1967) is a prolific composer, having scored over one thousand movie soundtracks and film trailers. His music typically has an epic quality.	IAU · 124368
124398 Iraklisimonia	2001 QK_{197}	Irakli Simonia (born 1961) created the world's first PhD program in archaeoastronomy at Ilia State University where he has pioneered the study of astronomy in ancient Georgia. He is author of more than 80 scientific papers on the history of astronomy, cometary astrophysics, meteorites and Trans-Neptunian Objects.	IAU · 124398

== 124401–124500 ==
back to top

Named minor planet	Provisional	This minor planet was named for...	Ref · Catalog
124450 Shyamalan	2001 QN_{264}	M. Night Shyamalan (born 1970), American filmmaker and actor	IAU · 124450

== 124501–124600 ==
back to top

Named minor planet	Provisional	This minor planet was named for...	Ref · Catalog
There are no named minor planets in this number range

== 124601–124700 ==
back to top

Named minor planet	Provisional	This minor planet was named for...	Ref · Catalog
There are no named minor planets in this number range

== 124701–124800 ==
back to top

Named minor planet	Provisional	This minor planet was named for...	Ref · Catalog
There are no named minor planets in this number range

== 124801–124900 ==
back to top

Named minor planet	Provisional	This minor planet was named for...	Ref · Catalog
124844 Hirotamasao	2001 TF_{15}	Masao Hirota (1930–1997), Japanese amateur astronomer and popularizer of astronomy	JPL · 124844
124845 Clinteastwood	2001 TH_{15}	Clint Eastwood (born 1930), an American actor, film director, composer, and producer.	IAU · 124845
124852 Cooper	2001 TB_{19}	F. Don Cooper, retired American physicist	IAU · 124852

== 124901–125000 ==
back to top

Named minor planet	Provisional	This minor planet was named for...	Ref · Catalog
There are no named minor planets in this number range

back to top

Preceded by 123,001–124,000	Meanings of minor-planet names List of minor planets: 124,001–125,000	Succeeded by 125,001–126,000
