= List of minor planets: 122001–123000 =

The following is a partial list of minor planets, running from minor-planet number 122001 through 123000, inclusive. The primary data for this and other partial lists is based on JPL's "Small-Body Orbital Elements" and data available from the Minor Planet Center. Critical list information is also provided by the MPC, unless otherwise specified from Lowell Observatory. A detailed description of the table's columns and additional sources are given on the main page including a complete list of every page in this series, and a statistical break-up on the dynamical classification of minor planets.

Also see the summary list of all named bodies in numerical and alphabetical order, and the corresponding naming citations for the number range of this particular list. New namings may only be added to this list after official publication, as the preannouncement of names is condemned by the Working Group for Small Bodies Nomenclature of the International Astronomical Union.

Near-Earth obj.	MBA (inner)	MBA (outer)	Centaur
Mars-crosser	MBA (middle)	Jupiter trojan	Trans-Neptunian obj.
Unclassified

== 122001–122100 ==
Designation			Discovery			Properties		Ref
Permanent	Provisional	Named after	Date	Site	Discoverer(s)	Category	Diam.	Ref
122001	2000 FQ_{50}	—	March 29, 2000	Kitt Peak	Spacewatch	·	1.1 km	MPC · JPL
122002	2000 FQ_{53}	—	March 29, 2000	Kitt Peak	Spacewatch	·	1.4 km	MPC · JPL
122003	2000 FP_{55}	—	March 29, 2000	Socorro	LINEAR	·	1.4 km	MPC · JPL
122004	2000 FF_{58}	—	March 26, 2000	Anderson Mesa	LONEOS	·	2.1 km	MPC · JPL
122005	2000 FT_{64}	—	March 30, 2000	Socorro	LINEAR	·	2.9 km	MPC · JPL
122006	2000 FN_{73}	—	March 25, 2000	Kitt Peak	Spacewatch	·	1.7 km	MPC · JPL
122007	2000 GC_{7}	—	April 4, 2000	Socorro	LINEAR	NYS · slow	2.7 km	MPC · JPL
122008	2000 GL_{7}	—	April 4, 2000	Socorro	LINEAR	NYS	1.5 km	MPC · JPL
122009	2000 GG_{10}	—	April 5, 2000	Socorro	LINEAR	·	1.3 km	MPC · JPL
122010	2000 GG_{26}	—	April 5, 2000	Socorro	LINEAR	·	1.6 km	MPC · JPL
122011	2000 GL_{28}	—	April 5, 2000	Socorro	LINEAR	NYS	2.5 km	MPC · JPL
122012	2000 GB_{34}	—	April 5, 2000	Socorro	LINEAR	·	4.3 km	MPC · JPL
122013	2000 GO_{34}	—	April 5, 2000	Socorro	LINEAR	V	1.2 km	MPC · JPL
122014	2000 GT_{34}	—	April 5, 2000	Socorro	LINEAR	·	1.5 km	MPC · JPL
122015	2000 GP_{35}	—	April 5, 2000	Socorro	LINEAR	·	2.5 km	MPC · JPL
122016	2000 GP_{42}	—	April 5, 2000	Socorro	LINEAR	·	2.0 km	MPC · JPL
122017	2000 GX_{42}	—	April 5, 2000	Socorro	LINEAR	NYS	2.7 km	MPC · JPL
122018	2000 GA_{43}	—	April 5, 2000	Socorro	LINEAR	MAS	1.1 km	MPC · JPL
122019	2000 GY_{43}	—	April 5, 2000	Socorro	LINEAR	(2076)	1.7 km	MPC · JPL
122020	2000 GS_{44}	—	April 5, 2000	Socorro	LINEAR	·	1.1 km	MPC · JPL
122021	2000 GD_{45}	—	April 5, 2000	Socorro	LINEAR	·	1.3 km	MPC · JPL
122022	2000 GY_{47}	—	April 5, 2000	Socorro	LINEAR	·	2.1 km	MPC · JPL
122023	2000 GC_{48}	—	April 5, 2000	Socorro	LINEAR	·	1.0 km	MPC · JPL
122024	2000 GC_{50}	—	April 5, 2000	Socorro	LINEAR	NYS	2.0 km	MPC · JPL
122025	2000 GR_{54}	—	April 5, 2000	Socorro	LINEAR	·	2.6 km	MPC · JPL
122026	2000 GV_{54}	—	April 5, 2000	Socorro	LINEAR	·	6.9 km	MPC · JPL
122027	2000 GD_{59}	—	April 5, 2000	Socorro	LINEAR	·	2.7 km	MPC · JPL
122028	2000 GR_{59}	—	April 5, 2000	Socorro	LINEAR	V	1.1 km	MPC · JPL
122029	2000 GE_{60}	—	April 5, 2000	Socorro	LINEAR	·	2.4 km	MPC · JPL
122030	2000 GB_{61}	—	April 5, 2000	Socorro	LINEAR	·	1.1 km	MPC · JPL
122031	2000 GU_{61}	—	April 5, 2000	Socorro	LINEAR	·	3.1 km	MPC · JPL
122032	2000 GS_{64}	—	April 5, 2000	Socorro	LINEAR	·	2.7 km	MPC · JPL
122033	2000 GU_{65}	—	April 5, 2000	Socorro	LINEAR	·	2.1 km	MPC · JPL
122034	2000 GL_{68}	—	April 5, 2000	Socorro	LINEAR	·	2.4 km	MPC · JPL
122035	2000 GP_{68}	—	April 5, 2000	Socorro	LINEAR	MAS	1.4 km	MPC · JPL
122036	2000 GK_{69}	—	April 5, 2000	Socorro	LINEAR	·	3.1 km	MPC · JPL
122037	2000 GO_{69}	—	April 5, 2000	Socorro	LINEAR	·	2.8 km	MPC · JPL
122038	2000 GJ_{75}	—	April 5, 2000	Socorro	LINEAR	NYS	2.2 km	MPC · JPL
122039	2000 GN_{76}	—	April 5, 2000	Socorro	LINEAR	NYS ·	4.0 km	MPC · JPL
122040	2000 GU_{76}	—	April 5, 2000	Socorro	LINEAR	·	1.8 km	MPC · JPL
122041	2000 GP_{77}	—	April 5, 2000	Socorro	LINEAR	·	2.3 km	MPC · JPL
122042	2000 GG_{79}	—	April 5, 2000	Socorro	LINEAR	·	2.4 km	MPC · JPL
122043	2000 GV_{79}	—	April 6, 2000	Socorro	LINEAR	(2076)	3.1 km	MPC · JPL
122044	2000 GQ_{82}	—	April 9, 2000	Prescott	P. G. Comba	·	2.2 km	MPC · JPL
122045	2000 GF_{90}	—	April 4, 2000	Socorro	LINEAR	·	2.4 km	MPC · JPL
122046	2000 GW_{90}	—	April 4, 2000	Socorro	LINEAR	·	1.8 km	MPC · JPL
122047	2000 GH_{92}	—	April 4, 2000	Socorro	LINEAR	·	1.5 km	MPC · JPL
122048	2000 GE_{105}	—	April 7, 2000	Socorro	LINEAR	·	2.9 km	MPC · JPL
122049	2000 GK_{112}	—	April 3, 2000	Anderson Mesa	LONEOS	·	4.5 km	MPC · JPL
122050	2000 GL_{115}	—	April 8, 2000	Socorro	LINEAR	NYS	2.3 km	MPC · JPL
122051	2000 GE_{122}	—	April 6, 2000	Kitt Peak	Spacewatch	·	2.7 km	MPC · JPL
122052	2000 GM_{125}	—	April 7, 2000	Socorro	LINEAR	V	2.9 km	MPC · JPL
122053	2000 GC_{140}	—	April 4, 2000	Anderson Mesa	LONEOS	PHO	2.0 km	MPC · JPL
122054	2000 GD_{144}	—	April 6, 2000	Kitt Peak	Spacewatch	·	1.8 km	MPC · JPL
122055	2000 GK_{145}	—	April 10, 2000	Kitt Peak	Spacewatch	V	1.3 km	MPC · JPL
122056	2000 GR_{147}	—	April 10, 2000	Kitt Peak	Spacewatch	·	1.8 km	MPC · JPL
122057	2000 GR_{149}	—	April 5, 2000	Socorro	LINEAR	·	2.1 km	MPC · JPL
122058	2000 GK_{150}	—	April 5, 2000	Socorro	LINEAR	·	1.2 km	MPC · JPL
122059	2000 GU_{153}	—	April 6, 2000	Anderson Mesa	LONEOS	·	2.2 km	MPC · JPL
122060	2000 GT_{156}	—	April 6, 2000	Socorro	LINEAR	·	2.5 km	MPC · JPL
122061	2000 GR_{164}	—	April 5, 2000	Socorro	LINEAR	NYS	2.7 km	MPC · JPL
122062	2000 GL_{168}	—	April 4, 2000	Anderson Mesa	LONEOS	NYS	2.5 km	MPC · JPL
122063	2000 GS_{173}	—	April 5, 2000	Anderson Mesa	LONEOS	·	1.9 km	MPC · JPL
122064	2000 GZ_{173}	—	April 5, 2000	Anderson Mesa	LONEOS	·	1.6 km	MPC · JPL
122065	2000 GX_{177}	—	April 4, 2000	Socorro	LINEAR	·	1.2 km	MPC · JPL
122066	2000 GG_{179}	—	April 5, 2000	Socorro	LINEAR	·	970 m	MPC · JPL
122067	2000 HJ_{5}	—	April 27, 2000	Baton Rouge	W. R. Cooney Jr.	·	1.2 km	MPC · JPL
122068	2000 HH_{6}	—	April 24, 2000	Kitt Peak	Spacewatch	NYS	1.7 km	MPC · JPL
122069	2000 HK_{6}	—	April 24, 2000	Kitt Peak	Spacewatch	·	2.4 km	MPC · JPL
122070	2000 HW_{6}	—	April 24, 2000	Kitt Peak	Spacewatch	·	1.9 km	MPC · JPL
122071	2000 HZ_{9}	—	April 27, 2000	Socorro	LINEAR	NYS	2.1 km	MPC · JPL
122072	2000 HX_{18}	—	April 25, 2000	Kitt Peak	Spacewatch	NYS	2.9 km	MPC · JPL
122073	2000 HJ_{21}	—	April 27, 2000	Socorro	LINEAR	·	3.2 km	MPC · JPL
122074	2000 HY_{22}	—	April 30, 2000	Socorro	LINEAR	·	1.3 km	MPC · JPL
122075	2000 HQ_{23}	—	April 30, 2000	Socorro	LINEAR	V	1.2 km	MPC · JPL
122076	2000 HV_{25}	—	April 24, 2000	Anderson Mesa	LONEOS	NYS	2.4 km	MPC · JPL
122077	2000 HO_{28}	—	April 29, 2000	Socorro	LINEAR	·	1.2 km	MPC · JPL
122078	2000 HM_{32}	—	April 29, 2000	Socorro	LINEAR	MAS	1.1 km	MPC · JPL
122079	2000 HB_{34}	—	April 25, 2000	Anderson Mesa	LONEOS	·	2.2 km	MPC · JPL
122080	2000 HT_{39}	—	April 29, 2000	Kitt Peak	Spacewatch	·	2.0 km	MPC · JPL
122081	2000 HU_{39}	—	April 29, 2000	Kitt Peak	Spacewatch	·	1.1 km	MPC · JPL
122082	2000 HD_{41}	—	April 28, 2000	Socorro	LINEAR	PHO	3.0 km	MPC · JPL
122083	2000 HC_{44}	—	April 25, 2000	Anderson Mesa	LONEOS	·	2.2 km	MPC · JPL
122084	2000 HJ_{45}	—	April 26, 2000	Anderson Mesa	LONEOS	·	1.1 km	MPC · JPL
122085	2000 HN_{45}	—	April 26, 2000	Anderson Mesa	LONEOS	·	2.1 km	MPC · JPL
122086	2000 HT_{45}	—	April 26, 2000	Anderson Mesa	LONEOS	·	1.5 km	MPC · JPL
122087	2000 HL_{46}	—	April 29, 2000	Socorro	LINEAR	·	1.2 km	MPC · JPL
122088	2000 HH_{47}	—	April 29, 2000	Socorro	LINEAR	V	1.3 km	MPC · JPL
122089	2000 HT_{48}	—	April 29, 2000	Socorro	LINEAR	·	2.0 km	MPC · JPL
122090	2000 HC_{50}	—	April 29, 2000	Socorro	LINEAR	·	2.7 km	MPC · JPL
122091	2000 HV_{50}	—	April 29, 2000	Socorro	LINEAR	MAS	1.5 km	MPC · JPL
122092	2000 HZ_{50}	—	April 29, 2000	Socorro	LINEAR	·	2.5 km	MPC · JPL
122093	2000 HQ_{60}	—	April 25, 2000	Anderson Mesa	LONEOS	·	2.6 km	MPC · JPL
122094	2000 HU_{60}	—	April 25, 2000	Anderson Mesa	LONEOS	NYS	1.8 km	MPC · JPL
122095	2000 HL_{62}	—	April 25, 2000	Kitt Peak	Spacewatch	NYS	1.7 km	MPC · JPL
122096	2000 HU_{63}	—	April 26, 2000	Anderson Mesa	LONEOS	NYS	2.8 km	MPC · JPL
122097	2000 HW_{69}	—	April 26, 2000	Anderson Mesa	LONEOS	NYS	2.5 km	MPC · JPL
122098	2000 HA_{70}	—	April 26, 2000	Anderson Mesa	LONEOS	·	1.6 km	MPC · JPL
122099	2000 HC_{71}	—	April 24, 2000	Anderson Mesa	LONEOS	·	1.2 km	MPC · JPL
122100	2000 HN_{71}	—	April 24, 2000	Anderson Mesa	LONEOS	·	2.4 km	MPC · JPL

== 122101–122200 ==
back to top

Designation			Discovery			Properties		Ref
Permanent	Provisional	Named after	Date	Site	Discoverer(s)	Category	Diam.	Ref
122101	2000 HG_{72}	—	April 25, 2000	Anderson Mesa	LONEOS	·	2.4 km	MPC · JPL
122102	2000 HM_{76}	—	April 27, 2000	Socorro	LINEAR	·	3.0 km	MPC · JPL
122103	2000 HQ_{76}	—	April 27, 2000	Socorro	LINEAR	·	1.9 km	MPC · JPL
122104	2000 HV_{84}	—	April 30, 2000	Haleakala	NEAT	·	2.4 km	MPC · JPL
122105	2000 HZ_{85}	—	April 30, 2000	Anderson Mesa	LONEOS	·	2.0 km	MPC · JPL
122106	2000 HC_{86}	—	April 30, 2000	Anderson Mesa	LONEOS	·	2.5 km	MPC · JPL
122107	2000 HR_{92}	—	April 29, 2000	Socorro	LINEAR	·	2.1 km	MPC · JPL
122108	2000 HQ_{93}	—	April 29, 2000	Socorro	LINEAR	NYS	2.0 km	MPC · JPL
122109	2000 HJ_{94}	—	April 29, 2000	Socorro	LINEAR	SUL	3.1 km	MPC · JPL
122110	2000 HN_{96}	—	April 28, 2000	Socorro	LINEAR	·	1.8 km	MPC · JPL
122111	2000 HU_{99}	—	April 26, 2000	Anderson Mesa	LONEOS	·	2.2 km	MPC · JPL
122112	2000 JV_{5}	—	May 1, 2000	Socorro	LINEAR	·	2.5 km	MPC · JPL
122113	2000 JE_{10}	—	May 3, 2000	Socorro	LINEAR	PHO	2.1 km	MPC · JPL
122114	2000 JB_{12}	—	May 5, 2000	Socorro	LINEAR	·	1.2 km	MPC · JPL
122115	2000 JE_{12}	—	May 5, 2000	Socorro	LINEAR	(2076)	2.1 km	MPC · JPL
122116	2000 JL_{12}	—	May 5, 2000	Socorro	LINEAR	PHO	2.1 km	MPC · JPL
122117	2000 JZ_{12}	—	May 6, 2000	Socorro	LINEAR	·	3.4 km	MPC · JPL
122118	2000 JN_{13}	—	May 6, 2000	Socorro	LINEAR	·	1.0 km	MPC · JPL
122119	2000 JP_{14}	—	May 6, 2000	Socorro	LINEAR	·	1.5 km	MPC · JPL
122120	2000 JJ_{15}	—	May 6, 2000	Socorro	LINEAR	fast	1.9 km	MPC · JPL
122121	2000 JQ_{15}	—	May 3, 2000	Socorro	LINEAR	·	2.9 km	MPC · JPL
122122	2000 JM_{16}	—	May 5, 2000	Socorro	LINEAR	V	1.8 km	MPC · JPL
122123	2000 JN_{16}	—	May 5, 2000	Socorro	LINEAR	NYS	2.3 km	MPC · JPL
122124	2000 JQ_{16}	—	May 5, 2000	Socorro	LINEAR	·	1.7 km	MPC · JPL
122125	2000 JO_{17}	—	May 6, 2000	Socorro	LINEAR	·	3.1 km	MPC · JPL
122126	2000 JG_{19}	—	May 4, 2000	Socorro	LINEAR	·	2.1 km	MPC · JPL
122127	2000 JO_{19}	—	May 4, 2000	Socorro	LINEAR	·	5.3 km	MPC · JPL
122128	2000 JW_{21}	—	May 6, 2000	Socorro	LINEAR	·	2.7 km	MPC · JPL
122129	2000 JX_{21}	—	May 6, 2000	Socorro	LINEAR	NYS	2.6 km	MPC · JPL
122130	2000 JE_{28}	—	May 7, 2000	Socorro	LINEAR	·	1.3 km	MPC · JPL
122131	2000 JF_{34}	—	May 7, 2000	Socorro	LINEAR	·	2.5 km	MPC · JPL
122132	2000 JO_{34}	—	May 7, 2000	Socorro	LINEAR	·	1.3 km	MPC · JPL
122133	2000 JW_{34}	—	May 7, 2000	Socorro	LINEAR	·	1.5 km	MPC · JPL
122134	2000 JF_{35}	—	May 7, 2000	Socorro	LINEAR	V	1.2 km	MPC · JPL
122135	2000 JR_{36}	—	May 7, 2000	Socorro	LINEAR	·	1.3 km	MPC · JPL
122136	2000 JB_{38}	—	May 7, 2000	Socorro	LINEAR	NYS	2.6 km	MPC · JPL
122137	2000 JL_{38}	—	May 7, 2000	Socorro	LINEAR	·	2.5 km	MPC · JPL
122138	2000 JQ_{38}	—	May 7, 2000	Socorro	LINEAR	·	2.3 km	MPC · JPL
122139	2000 JF_{39}	—	May 7, 2000	Socorro	LINEAR	MAS	1.5 km	MPC · JPL
122140	2000 JP_{40}	—	May 5, 2000	Socorro	LINEAR	·	5.2 km	MPC · JPL
122141	2000 JQ_{41}	—	May 7, 2000	Socorro	LINEAR	·	2.9 km	MPC · JPL
122142	2000 JW_{41}	—	May 7, 2000	Socorro	LINEAR	MAS	1.0 km	MPC · JPL
122143	2000 JY_{41}	—	May 7, 2000	Socorro	LINEAR	MAS	1.2 km	MPC · JPL
122144	2000 JY_{42}	—	May 7, 2000	Socorro	LINEAR	·	1.9 km	MPC · JPL
122145	2000 JK_{43}	—	May 7, 2000	Socorro	LINEAR	·	1.0 km	MPC · JPL
122146	2000 JT_{44}	—	May 7, 2000	Socorro	LINEAR	MAS	1.6 km	MPC · JPL
122147	2000 JC_{45}	—	May 7, 2000	Socorro	LINEAR	·	3.7 km	MPC · JPL
122148	2000 JE_{45}	—	May 7, 2000	Socorro	LINEAR	NYS	1.9 km	MPC · JPL
122149	2000 JN_{45}	—	May 7, 2000	Socorro	LINEAR	·	970 m	MPC · JPL
122150	2000 JY_{45}	—	May 7, 2000	Socorro	LINEAR	·	1.8 km	MPC · JPL
122151	2000 JJ_{46}	—	May 7, 2000	Socorro	LINEAR	·	2.3 km	MPC · JPL
122152	2000 JA_{53}	—	May 9, 2000	Socorro	LINEAR	·	1.2 km	MPC · JPL
122153	2000 JO_{57}	—	May 6, 2000	Socorro	LINEAR	·	3.5 km	MPC · JPL
122154	2000 JS_{59}	—	May 7, 2000	Socorro	LINEAR	·	3.2 km	MPC · JPL
122155	2000 JY_{60}	—	May 7, 2000	Socorro	LINEAR	·	1.7 km	MPC · JPL
122156	2000 JU_{69}	—	May 2, 2000	Anderson Mesa	LONEOS	·	3.5 km	MPC · JPL
122157	2000 JA_{73}	—	May 2, 2000	Anderson Mesa	LONEOS	·	3.1 km	MPC · JPL
122158	2000 JP_{74}	—	May 4, 2000	Anderson Mesa	LONEOS	·	5.4 km	MPC · JPL
122159	2000 JM_{81}	—	May 9, 2000	Socorro	LINEAR	·	2.3 km	MPC · JPL
122160	2000 JJ_{82}	—	May 7, 2000	Socorro	LINEAR	·	2.0 km	MPC · JPL
122161	2000 JQ_{84}	—	May 13, 2000	Kitt Peak	Spacewatch	·	2.1 km	MPC · JPL
122162	2000 KX_{1}	—	May 26, 2000	Prescott	P. G. Comba	RAF	1.7 km	MPC · JPL
122163	2000 KA_{2}	—	May 27, 2000	Črni Vrh	Mikuž, H.	·	1.7 km	MPC · JPL
122164	2000 KA_{3}	—	May 27, 2000	Socorro	LINEAR	·	6.4 km	MPC · JPL
122165	2000 KJ_{3}	—	May 27, 2000	Socorro	LINEAR	·	2.0 km	MPC · JPL
122166	2000 KD_{7}	—	May 27, 2000	Socorro	LINEAR	·	3.3 km	MPC · JPL
122167	2000 KZ_{7}	—	May 27, 2000	Socorro	LINEAR	·	3.5 km	MPC · JPL
122168	2000 KO_{9}	—	May 28, 2000	Socorro	LINEAR	NYS	2.0 km	MPC · JPL
122169	2000 KL_{10}	—	May 28, 2000	Socorro	LINEAR	·	2.1 km	MPC · JPL
122170	2000 KR_{11}	—	May 28, 2000	Socorro	LINEAR	V	1.3 km	MPC · JPL
122171	2000 KZ_{13}	—	May 28, 2000	Socorro	LINEAR	·	2.6 km	MPC · JPL
122172	2000 KJ_{18}	—	May 28, 2000	Socorro	LINEAR	·	1.3 km	MPC · JPL
122173	2000 KC_{28}	—	May 28, 2000	Socorro	LINEAR	V	1.1 km	MPC · JPL
122174	2000 KC_{31}	—	May 28, 2000	Socorro	LINEAR	·	2.5 km	MPC · JPL
122175	2000 KL_{34}	—	May 27, 2000	Socorro	LINEAR	·	2.5 km	MPC · JPL
122176	2000 KK_{35}	—	May 27, 2000	Socorro	LINEAR	·	2.1 km	MPC · JPL
122177	2000 KU_{35}	—	May 27, 2000	Socorro	LINEAR	·	1.4 km	MPC · JPL
122178	2000 KZ_{37}	—	May 24, 2000	Kitt Peak	Spacewatch	·	2.9 km	MPC · JPL
122179	2000 KT_{38}	—	May 24, 2000	Kitt Peak	Spacewatch	fast	2.2 km	MPC · JPL
122180	2000 KV_{43}	—	May 28, 2000	Socorro	LINEAR	·	910 m	MPC · JPL
122181	2000 KZ_{46}	—	May 27, 2000	Socorro	LINEAR	·	3.1 km	MPC · JPL
122182	2000 KM_{49}	—	May 30, 2000	Kitt Peak	Spacewatch	·	2.3 km	MPC · JPL
122183	2000 KY_{57}	—	May 24, 2000	Anderson Mesa	LONEOS	·	1.8 km	MPC · JPL
122184	2000 KA_{58}	—	May 24, 2000	Anderson Mesa	LONEOS	fast	2.5 km	MPC · JPL
122185	2000 KF_{58}	—	May 24, 2000	Anderson Mesa	LONEOS	V · slow	1.2 km	MPC · JPL
122186	2000 KC_{60}	—	May 25, 2000	Anderson Mesa	LONEOS	·	3.0 km	MPC · JPL
122187	2000 KW_{61}	—	May 26, 2000	Kitt Peak	Spacewatch	·	3.0 km	MPC · JPL
122188	2000 KM_{63}	—	May 26, 2000	Anderson Mesa	LONEOS	V	1.7 km	MPC · JPL
122189	2000 KP_{70}	—	May 28, 2000	Socorro	LINEAR	·	2.0 km	MPC · JPL
122190	2000 KY_{74}	—	May 27, 2000	Socorro	LINEAR	NYS ·	3.1 km	MPC · JPL
122191	2000 KV_{79}	—	May 27, 2000	Socorro	LINEAR	·	1.3 km	MPC · JPL
122192	2000 KK_{82}	—	May 24, 2000	Kitt Peak	Spacewatch	·	2.3 km	MPC · JPL
122193	2000 LJ_{1}	—	June 2, 2000	Črni Vrh	Matičič, S.	·	2.6 km	MPC · JPL
122194	2000 LS_{1}	—	June 1, 2000	Haleakala	NEAT	·	2.1 km	MPC · JPL
122195	2000 LU_{2}	—	June 4, 2000	Farpoint	G. Hug	fast	2.0 km	MPC · JPL
122196	2000 LE_{7}	—	June 6, 2000	Kitt Peak	Spacewatch	·	1.5 km	MPC · JPL
122197	2000 LV_{9}	—	June 1, 2000	Socorro	LINEAR	PHO	1.5 km	MPC · JPL
122198	2000 LE_{16}	—	June 7, 2000	Socorro	LINEAR	PHO	2.4 km	MPC · JPL
122199	2000 LS_{20}	—	June 8, 2000	Socorro	LINEAR	·	3.1 km	MPC · JPL
122200	2000 LD_{21}	—	June 8, 2000	Socorro	LINEAR	PHO	2.8 km	MPC · JPL

== 122201–122300 ==
back to top

Designation			Discovery			Properties		Ref
Permanent	Provisional	Named after	Date	Site	Discoverer(s)	Category	Diam.	Ref
122201	2000 LG_{21}	—	June 8, 2000	Socorro	LINEAR	·	4.8 km	MPC · JPL
122202	2000 LX_{21}	—	June 8, 2000	Socorro	LINEAR	·	1.7 km	MPC · JPL
122203	2000 LT_{26}	—	June 1, 2000	Anderson Mesa	LONEOS	·	3.1 km	MPC · JPL
122204	2000 LD_{28}	—	June 6, 2000	Anderson Mesa	LONEOS	·	1.4 km	MPC · JPL
122205	2000 LO_{30}	—	June 8, 2000	Socorro	LINEAR	·	1.7 km	MPC · JPL
122206	2000 LH_{31}	—	June 6, 2000	Anderson Mesa	LONEOS	EUN	3.1 km	MPC · JPL
122207	2000 LQ_{32}	—	June 4, 2000	Socorro	LINEAR	·	2.6 km	MPC · JPL
122208	2000 LY_{35}	—	June 1, 2000	Anderson Mesa	LONEOS	·	4.3 km	MPC · JPL
122209	2000 MY_{2}	—	June 27, 2000	Reedy Creek	J. Broughton	·	2.5 km	MPC · JPL
122210	2000 NL_{3}	—	July 7, 2000	Črni Vrh	Matičič, S.	EUN	2.6 km	MPC · JPL
122211	2000 ND_{4}	—	July 3, 2000	Kitt Peak	Spacewatch	·	2.7 km	MPC · JPL
122212	2000 NG_{4}	—	July 3, 2000	Kitt Peak	Spacewatch	·	1.6 km	MPC · JPL
122213	2000 NE_{7}	—	July 4, 2000	Kitt Peak	Spacewatch	·	1.9 km	MPC · JPL
122214	2000 NR_{7}	—	July 4, 2000	Kitt Peak	Spacewatch	·	2.2 km	MPC · JPL
122215	2000 NE_{10}	—	July 1, 2000	Siding Spring	R. H. McNaught	·	2.9 km	MPC · JPL
122216	2000 NG_{12}	—	July 5, 2000	Anderson Mesa	LONEOS	JUN	2.7 km	MPC · JPL
122217	2000 NR_{13}	—	July 5, 2000	Anderson Mesa	LONEOS	(5)	2.6 km	MPC · JPL
122218	2000 NY_{15}	—	July 5, 2000	Anderson Mesa	LONEOS	·	2.8 km	MPC · JPL
122219	2000 NF_{16}	—	July 5, 2000	Anderson Mesa	LONEOS	·	3.3 km	MPC · JPL
122220	2000 NT_{16}	—	July 5, 2000	Anderson Mesa	LONEOS	·	2.5 km	MPC · JPL
122221	2000 ND_{20}	—	July 6, 2000	Kitt Peak	Spacewatch	·	3.1 km	MPC · JPL
122222	2000 ND_{22}	—	July 7, 2000	Socorro	LINEAR	·	2.3 km	MPC · JPL
122223	2000 NM_{22}	—	July 7, 2000	Anderson Mesa	LONEOS	EUN	2.6 km	MPC · JPL
122224	2000 NL_{23}	—	July 5, 2000	Anderson Mesa	LONEOS	·	1.7 km	MPC · JPL
122225	2000 NO_{24}	—	July 4, 2000	Anderson Mesa	LONEOS	·	1.9 km	MPC · JPL
122226	2000 NX_{26}	—	July 4, 2000	Anderson Mesa	LONEOS	EUN	2.7 km	MPC · JPL
122227	2000 OJ	—	July 22, 2000	Socorro	LINEAR	BAR	2.7 km	MPC · JPL
122228	2000 OA_{2}	—	July 27, 2000	Prescott	P. G. Comba	·	2.1 km	MPC · JPL
122229	2000 OC_{2}	—	July 27, 2000	Prescott	P. G. Comba	·	1.9 km	MPC · JPL
122230	2000 OQ_{3}	—	July 24, 2000	Socorro	LINEAR	(5)	2.8 km	MPC · JPL
122231	2000 OV_{5}	—	July 24, 2000	Socorro	LINEAR	·	6.4 km	MPC · JPL
122232	2000 OW_{5}	—	July 24, 2000	Socorro	LINEAR	·	5.1 km	MPC · JPL
122233	2000 OH_{7}	—	July 29, 2000	Lake Tekapo	Lake Tekapo	·	3.9 km	MPC · JPL
122234	2000 OO_{7}	—	July 30, 2000	Socorro	LINEAR	BAR	3.1 km	MPC · JPL
122235	2000 OT_{10}	—	July 23, 2000	Socorro	LINEAR	·	3.5 km	MPC · JPL
122236	2000 OJ_{11}	—	July 23, 2000	Socorro	LINEAR	·	1.2 km	MPC · JPL
122237	2000 OY_{11}	—	July 23, 2000	Socorro	LINEAR	·	1.5 km	MPC · JPL
122238	2000 OB_{14}	—	July 23, 2000	Socorro	LINEAR	ADE	3.9 km	MPC · JPL
122239	2000 OC_{14}	—	July 23, 2000	Socorro	LINEAR	NYS	2.2 km	MPC · JPL
122240	2000 OF_{14}	—	July 23, 2000	Socorro	LINEAR	(5)	2.0 km	MPC · JPL
122241	2000 OA_{17}	—	July 23, 2000	Socorro	LINEAR	·	2.3 km	MPC · JPL
122242	2000 OL_{17}	—	July 23, 2000	Socorro	LINEAR	·	3.2 km	MPC · JPL
122243	2000 OG_{18}	—	July 23, 2000	Socorro	LINEAR	·	1.9 km	MPC · JPL
122244	2000 OS_{19}	—	July 30, 2000	Socorro	LINEAR	·	2.5 km	MPC · JPL
122245	2000 OS_{21}	—	July 30, 2000	Socorro	LINEAR	PHO	3.7 km	MPC · JPL
122246	2000 OT_{21}	—	July 30, 2000	Socorro	LINEAR	·	4.5 km	MPC · JPL
122247	2000 OM_{27}	—	July 23, 2000	Socorro	LINEAR	·	2.8 km	MPC · JPL
122248	2000 OE_{29}	—	July 30, 2000	Socorro	LINEAR	·	3.0 km	MPC · JPL
122249	2000 OR_{30}	—	July 30, 2000	Socorro	LINEAR	DOR	4.9 km	MPC · JPL
122250	2000 OP_{31}	—	July 30, 2000	Socorro	LINEAR	·	3.2 km	MPC · JPL
122251	2000 OV_{31}	—	July 30, 2000	Socorro	LINEAR	MAR	2.3 km	MPC · JPL
122252	2000 OM_{38}	—	July 30, 2000	Socorro	LINEAR	EUN	2.2 km	MPC · JPL
122253	2000 OW_{38}	—	July 30, 2000	Socorro	LINEAR	EUN	2.1 km	MPC · JPL
122254	2000 OW_{39}	—	July 30, 2000	Socorro	LINEAR	·	3.4 km	MPC · JPL
122255	2000 OB_{41}	—	July 30, 2000	Socorro	LINEAR	·	5.7 km	MPC · JPL
122256	2000 OA_{42}	—	July 30, 2000	Socorro	LINEAR	·	6.0 km	MPC · JPL
122257	2000 OW_{42}	—	July 30, 2000	Socorro	LINEAR	·	3.2 km	MPC · JPL
122258	2000 OD_{44}	—	July 30, 2000	Socorro	LINEAR	·	2.9 km	MPC · JPL
122259	2000 OH_{44}	—	July 30, 2000	Socorro	LINEAR	·	1.9 km	MPC · JPL
122260	2000 OY_{44}	—	July 30, 2000	Socorro	LINEAR	·	3.3 km	MPC · JPL
122261	2000 OK_{45}	—	July 30, 2000	Socorro	LINEAR	·	2.8 km	MPC · JPL
122262	2000 ON_{46}	—	July 31, 2000	Socorro	LINEAR	·	1.9 km	MPC · JPL
122263	2000 OX_{49}	—	July 31, 2000	Socorro	LINEAR	PHO	5.5 km	MPC · JPL
122264	2000 OO_{52}	—	July 31, 2000	Socorro	LINEAR	V	1.9 km	MPC · JPL
122265	2000 OZ_{52}	—	July 31, 2000	Socorro	LINEAR	·	3.0 km	MPC · JPL
122266	2000 OR_{53}	—	July 30, 2000	Socorro	LINEAR	JUN	1.9 km	MPC · JPL
122267	2000 OP_{54}	—	July 29, 2000	Anderson Mesa	LONEOS	·	3.1 km	MPC · JPL
122268	2000 OF_{57}	—	July 29, 2000	Anderson Mesa	LONEOS	·	2.7 km	MPC · JPL
122269	2000 OH_{58}	—	July 29, 2000	Anderson Mesa	LONEOS	·	2.1 km	MPC · JPL
122270	2000 OP_{58}	—	July 29, 2000	Anderson Mesa	LONEOS	·	2.0 km	MPC · JPL
122271	2000 OD_{61}	—	July 30, 2000	Socorro	LINEAR	MAR	3.4 km	MPC · JPL
122272	2000 PV	—	August 1, 2000	Socorro	LINEAR	·	3.2 km	MPC · JPL
122273	2000 PT_{1}	—	August 3, 2000	Prescott	P. G. Comba	·	1.7 km	MPC · JPL
122274	2000 PH_{3}	—	August 1, 2000	Črni Vrh	Mikuž, H.	·	1.5 km	MPC · JPL
122275	2000 PG_{4}	—	August 1, 2000	Socorro	LINEAR	MAS	1.5 km	MPC · JPL
122276	2000 PJ_{4}	—	August 1, 2000	Socorro	LINEAR	·	1.6 km	MPC · JPL
122277	2000 PY_{4}	—	August 4, 2000	Haleakala	NEAT	PAL	3.7 km	MPC · JPL
122278	2000 PD_{5}	—	August 5, 2000	Haleakala	NEAT	·	1.7 km	MPC · JPL
122279	2000 PE_{7}	—	August 6, 2000	Bisei SG Center	BATTeRS	·	4.0 km	MPC · JPL
122280	2000 PQ_{8}	—	August 8, 2000	Ondřejov	L. Kotková	·	1.4 km	MPC · JPL
122281	2000 PS_{12}	—	August 8, 2000	Socorro	LINEAR	·	3.4 km	MPC · JPL
122282	2000 PD_{14}	—	August 1, 2000	Socorro	LINEAR	·	2.0 km	MPC · JPL
122283	2000 PH_{14}	—	August 1, 2000	Socorro	LINEAR	·	3.3 km	MPC · JPL
122284	2000 PO_{14}	—	August 1, 2000	Socorro	LINEAR	EUN	2.3 km	MPC · JPL
122285	2000 PM_{16}	—	August 1, 2000	Socorro	LINEAR	·	2.3 km	MPC · JPL
122286	2000 PQ_{16}	—	August 1, 2000	Socorro	LINEAR	·	2.9 km	MPC · JPL
122287	2000 PZ_{16}	—	August 1, 2000	Socorro	LINEAR	·	1.6 km	MPC · JPL
122288	2000 PG_{17}	—	August 1, 2000	Socorro	LINEAR	·	2.1 km	MPC · JPL
122289	2000 PQ_{18}	—	August 1, 2000	Socorro	LINEAR	·	2.4 km	MPC · JPL
122290	2000 PS_{18}	—	August 1, 2000	Socorro	LINEAR	·	2.5 km	MPC · JPL
122291	2000 PN_{19}	—	August 1, 2000	Socorro	LINEAR	·	2.6 km	MPC · JPL
122292	2000 PG_{20}	—	August 1, 2000	Socorro	LINEAR	EUN	2.3 km	MPC · JPL
122293	2000 PP_{20}	—	August 1, 2000	Socorro	LINEAR	·	4.8 km	MPC · JPL
122294	2000 PS_{20}	—	August 1, 2000	Socorro	LINEAR	·	3.8 km	MPC · JPL
122295	2000 PH_{21}	—	August 1, 2000	Socorro	LINEAR	·	2.3 km	MPC · JPL
122296	2000 PM_{22}	—	August 1, 2000	Socorro	LINEAR	EUN	2.8 km	MPC · JPL
122297	2000 PJ_{23}	—	August 2, 2000	Socorro	LINEAR	·	1.9 km	MPC · JPL
122298	2000 PP_{25}	—	August 4, 2000	Socorro	LINEAR	·	3.3 km	MPC · JPL
122299	2000 PQ_{25}	—	August 4, 2000	Socorro	LINEAR	·	3.6 km	MPC · JPL
122300	2000 QF_{3}	—	August 24, 2000	Socorro	LINEAR	·	2.0 km	MPC · JPL

== 122301–122400 ==
back to top

Designation			Discovery			Properties		Ref
Permanent	Provisional	Named after	Date	Site	Discoverer(s)	Category	Diam.	Ref
122301	2000 QQ_{3}	—	August 24, 2000	Socorro	LINEAR	·	2.1 km	MPC · JPL
122302	2000 QO_{4}	—	August 24, 2000	Socorro	LINEAR	·	4.3 km	MPC · JPL
122303	2000 QA_{5}	—	August 24, 2000	Socorro	LINEAR	·	2.7 km	MPC · JPL
122304	2000 QT_{5}	—	August 24, 2000	Socorro	LINEAR	V	1.5 km	MPC · JPL
122305	2000 QV_{5}	—	August 24, 2000	Socorro	LINEAR	V	1.6 km	MPC · JPL
122306	2000 QD_{6}	—	August 24, 2000	Farra d'Isonzo	Farra d'Isonzo	V	1.6 km	MPC · JPL
122307	2000 QE_{8}	—	August 25, 2000	Višnjan Observatory	K. Korlević, M. Jurić	·	4.0 km	MPC · JPL
122308	2000 QJ_{8}	—	August 25, 2000	Višnjan Observatory	K. Korlević, M. Jurić	·	1.8 km	MPC · JPL
122309	2000 QV_{8}	—	August 24, 2000	Črni Vrh	Skvarč, J.	V	1.3 km	MPC · JPL
122310	2000 QJ_{9}	—	August 21, 2000	Saltsjöbaden	A. Brandeker	·	5.3 km	MPC · JPL
122311	2000 QL_{9}	—	August 25, 2000	Ondřejov	P. Kušnirák, P. Pravec	·	3.3 km	MPC · JPL
122312	2000 QU_{9}	—	August 24, 2000	Bergisch Gladbach	W. Bickel	·	3.5 km	MPC · JPL
122313	2000 QL_{10}	—	August 24, 2000	Socorro	LINEAR	·	1.4 km	MPC · JPL
122314	2000 QS_{10}	—	August 24, 2000	Socorro	LINEAR	NYS	2.4 km	MPC · JPL
122315	2000 QO_{12}	—	August 24, 2000	Socorro	LINEAR	NYS	2.0 km	MPC · JPL
122316	2000 QQ_{12}	—	August 24, 2000	Socorro	LINEAR	·	2.0 km	MPC · JPL
122317	2000 QU_{12}	—	August 24, 2000	Socorro	LINEAR	NYS	2.1 km	MPC · JPL
122318	2000 QV_{12}	—	August 24, 2000	Socorro	LINEAR	·	5.3 km	MPC · JPL
122319	2000 QQ_{13}	—	August 24, 2000	Socorro	LINEAR	HNS	3.9 km	MPC · JPL
122320	2000 QX_{13}	—	August 24, 2000	Socorro	LINEAR	·	2.6 km	MPC · JPL
122321	2000 QB_{14}	—	August 24, 2000	Socorro	LINEAR	MAS	1.1 km	MPC · JPL
122322	2000 QQ_{15}	—	August 24, 2000	Socorro	LINEAR	·	1.4 km	MPC · JPL
122323	2000 QZ_{17}	—	August 24, 2000	Socorro	LINEAR	·	1.6 km	MPC · JPL
122324	2000 QO_{19}	—	August 24, 2000	Socorro	LINEAR	·	3.3 km	MPC · JPL
122325	2000 QP_{19}	—	August 24, 2000	Socorro	LINEAR	·	3.2 km	MPC · JPL
122326	2000 QH_{20}	—	August 24, 2000	Socorro	LINEAR	NYS	2.5 km	MPC · JPL
122327	2000 QO_{20}	—	August 24, 2000	Socorro	LINEAR	·	2.7 km	MPC · JPL
122328	2000 QJ_{21}	—	August 24, 2000	Socorro	LINEAR	·	3.8 km	MPC · JPL
122329	2000 QZ_{22}	—	August 25, 2000	Socorro	LINEAR	·	2.5 km	MPC · JPL
122330	2000 QL_{23}	—	August 25, 2000	Socorro	LINEAR	·	1.9 km	MPC · JPL
122331	2000 QY_{24}	—	August 25, 2000	Socorro	LINEAR	·	3.0 km	MPC · JPL
122332	2000 QY_{26}	—	August 24, 2000	Socorro	LINEAR	·	2.4 km	MPC · JPL
122333	2000 QE_{27}	—	August 24, 2000	Socorro	LINEAR	NYS	1.9 km	MPC · JPL
122334	2000 QM_{28}	—	August 24, 2000	Socorro	LINEAR	NYS	1.6 km	MPC · JPL
122335	2000 QX_{28}	—	August 24, 2000	Socorro	LINEAR	·	4.4 km	MPC · JPL
122336	2000 QS_{34}	—	August 26, 2000	Socorro	LINEAR	·	8.7 km	MPC · JPL
122337	2000 QA_{35}	—	August 27, 2000	Ondřejov	P. Pravec, P. Kušnirák	·	1.9 km	MPC · JPL
122338	2000 QD_{36}	—	August 24, 2000	Socorro	LINEAR	·	2.3 km	MPC · JPL
122339	2000 QG_{36}	—	August 24, 2000	Socorro	LINEAR	·	2.4 km	MPC · JPL
122340	2000 QL_{36}	—	August 24, 2000	Socorro	LINEAR	·	5.4 km	MPC · JPL
122341	2000 QT_{36}	—	August 24, 2000	Socorro	LINEAR	·	1.4 km	MPC · JPL
122342	2000 QT_{37}	—	August 24, 2000	Socorro	LINEAR	·	2.0 km	MPC · JPL
122343	2000 QK_{38}	—	August 24, 2000	Socorro	LINEAR	V	1.9 km	MPC · JPL
122344	2000 QR_{38}	—	August 24, 2000	Socorro	LINEAR	·	3.0 km	MPC · JPL
122345	2000 QW_{38}	—	August 24, 2000	Socorro	LINEAR	NYS	2.4 km	MPC · JPL
122346	2000 QY_{38}	—	August 24, 2000	Socorro	LINEAR	·	2.7 km	MPC · JPL
122347	2000 QC_{40}	—	August 24, 2000	Socorro	LINEAR	NYS	1.8 km	MPC · JPL
122348	2000 QT_{40}	—	August 24, 2000	Socorro	LINEAR	RAF	1.9 km	MPC · JPL
122349	2000 QH_{41}	—	August 24, 2000	Socorro	LINEAR	(5)	2.4 km	MPC · JPL
122350	2000 QB_{42}	—	August 24, 2000	Socorro	LINEAR	·	3.0 km	MPC · JPL
122351	2000 QH_{44}	—	August 24, 2000	Socorro	LINEAR	V	1.9 km	MPC · JPL
122352	2000 QK_{44}	—	August 24, 2000	Socorro	LINEAR	·	1.7 km	MPC · JPL
122353	2000 QT_{44}	—	August 24, 2000	Socorro	LINEAR	EUN	1.8 km	MPC · JPL
122354	2000 QX_{44}	—	August 24, 2000	Socorro	LINEAR	·	1.7 km	MPC · JPL
122355	2000 QU_{47}	—	August 24, 2000	Socorro	LINEAR	NYS	2.3 km	MPC · JPL
122356	2000 QW_{48}	—	August 24, 2000	Socorro	LINEAR	EUN	2.6 km	MPC · JPL
122357	2000 QH_{49}	—	August 24, 2000	Socorro	LINEAR	MAS	1.4 km	MPC · JPL
122358	2000 QM_{49}	—	August 24, 2000	Socorro	LINEAR	·	1.4 km	MPC · JPL
122359	2000 QS_{50}	—	August 24, 2000	Socorro	LINEAR	·	2.9 km	MPC · JPL
122360	2000 QJ_{51}	—	August 24, 2000	Socorro	LINEAR	·	1.8 km	MPC · JPL
122361	2000 QF_{52}	—	August 24, 2000	Socorro	LINEAR	·	3.5 km	MPC · JPL
122362	2000 QG_{52}	—	August 24, 2000	Socorro	LINEAR	NYS	1.5 km	MPC · JPL
122363	2000 QK_{52}	—	August 24, 2000	Socorro	LINEAR	·	2.1 km	MPC · JPL
122364	2000 QH_{54}	—	August 25, 2000	Socorro	LINEAR	NYS ·	3.4 km	MPC · JPL
122365	2000 QL_{54}	—	August 25, 2000	Socorro	LINEAR	NYS	2.0 km	MPC · JPL
122366	2000 QC_{57}	—	August 26, 2000	Socorro	LINEAR	KOR	2.6 km	MPC · JPL
122367	2000 QW_{57}	—	August 26, 2000	Socorro	LINEAR	·	3.1 km	MPC · JPL
122368	2000 QZ_{57}	—	August 26, 2000	Socorro	LINEAR	V	1.8 km	MPC · JPL
122369	2000 QK_{58}	—	August 26, 2000	Socorro	LINEAR	·	3.1 km	MPC · JPL
122370	2000 QA_{59}	—	August 26, 2000	Socorro	LINEAR	·	1.6 km	MPC · JPL
122371	2000 QH_{60}	—	August 26, 2000	Socorro	LINEAR	·	2.3 km	MPC · JPL
122372	2000 QU_{60}	—	August 26, 2000	Socorro	LINEAR	·	2.6 km	MPC · JPL
122373	2000 QN_{61}	—	August 28, 2000	Socorro	LINEAR	·	2.2 km	MPC · JPL
122374	2000 QO_{63}	—	August 28, 2000	Socorro	LINEAR	V	1.6 km	MPC · JPL
122375	2000 QO_{64}	—	August 28, 2000	Socorro	LINEAR	·	1.6 km	MPC · JPL
122376	2000 QO_{65}	—	August 28, 2000	Socorro	LINEAR	·	3.2 km	MPC · JPL
122377	2000 QU_{65}	—	August 28, 2000	Socorro	LINEAR	·	2.6 km	MPC · JPL
122378	2000 QA_{66}	—	August 28, 2000	Socorro	LINEAR	·	4.8 km	MPC · JPL
122379	2000 QG_{67}	—	August 28, 2000	Socorro	LINEAR	PHO	8.2 km	MPC · JPL
122380	2000 QA_{70}	—	August 24, 2000	Socorro	LINEAR	·	3.8 km	MPC · JPL
122381	2000 QH_{70}	—	August 28, 2000	Socorro	LINEAR	·	1.6 km	MPC · JPL
122382	2000 QT_{70}	—	August 29, 2000	Socorro	LINEAR	BAR	2.8 km	MPC · JPL
122383	2000 QW_{70}	—	August 26, 2000	Prescott	P. G. Comba	·	3.5 km	MPC · JPL
122384	2000 QU_{71}	—	August 24, 2000	Socorro	LINEAR	·	2.9 km	MPC · JPL
122385	2000 QG_{72}	—	August 24, 2000	Socorro	LINEAR	·	2.6 km	MPC · JPL
122386	2000 QK_{72}	—	August 24, 2000	Socorro	LINEAR	·	2.5 km	MPC · JPL
122387	2000 QQ_{72}	—	August 24, 2000	Socorro	LINEAR	·	4.1 km	MPC · JPL
122388	2000 QV_{72}	—	August 24, 2000	Socorro	LINEAR	NYS	1.8 km	MPC · JPL
122389	2000 QW_{74}	—	August 24, 2000	Socorro	LINEAR	NYS	2.1 km	MPC · JPL
122390	2000 QH_{75}	—	August 24, 2000	Socorro	LINEAR	·	3.2 km	MPC · JPL
122391	2000 QZ_{75}	—	August 24, 2000	Socorro	LINEAR	L5	20 km	MPC · JPL
122392	2000 QP_{76}	—	August 24, 2000	Socorro	LINEAR	V	1.4 km	MPC · JPL
122393	2000 QG_{77}	—	August 24, 2000	Socorro	LINEAR	·	4.0 km	MPC · JPL
122394	2000 QN_{77}	—	August 24, 2000	Socorro	LINEAR	NYS	1.7 km	MPC · JPL
122395	2000 QR_{77}	—	August 24, 2000	Socorro	LINEAR	·	2.1 km	MPC · JPL
122396	2000 QS_{77}	—	August 24, 2000	Socorro	LINEAR	·	3.5 km	MPC · JPL
122397	2000 QJ_{79}	—	August 24, 2000	Socorro	LINEAR	·	2.5 km	MPC · JPL
122398	2000 QK_{79}	—	August 24, 2000	Socorro	LINEAR	LEO	3.8 km	MPC · JPL
122399	2000 QO_{79}	—	August 24, 2000	Socorro	LINEAR	(5)	2.2 km	MPC · JPL
122400	2000 QZ_{80}	—	August 24, 2000	Socorro	LINEAR	AGN	2.5 km	MPC · JPL

== 122401–122500 ==
back to top

Designation			Discovery			Properties		Ref
Permanent	Provisional	Named after	Date	Site	Discoverer(s)	Category	Diam.	Ref
122401	2000 QS_{81}	—	August 24, 2000	Socorro	LINEAR	·	2.1 km	MPC · JPL
122402	2000 QD_{83}	—	August 24, 2000	Socorro	LINEAR	·	3.7 km	MPC · JPL
122403	2000 QL_{83}	—	August 24, 2000	Socorro	LINEAR	V	1.5 km	MPC · JPL
122404	2000 QE_{86}	—	August 25, 2000	Socorro	LINEAR	V	1.3 km	MPC · JPL
122405	2000 QZ_{86}	—	August 25, 2000	Socorro	LINEAR	V	1.3 km	MPC · JPL
122406	2000 QB_{87}	—	August 25, 2000	Socorro	LINEAR	·	3.0 km	MPC · JPL
122407	2000 QN_{87}	—	August 25, 2000	Socorro	LINEAR	·	4.3 km	MPC · JPL
122408	2000 QV_{88}	—	August 25, 2000	Socorro	LINEAR	·	2.5 km	MPC · JPL
122409	2000 QE_{89}	—	August 25, 2000	Socorro	LINEAR	·	3.9 km	MPC · JPL
122410	2000 QD_{90}	—	August 25, 2000	Socorro	LINEAR	MAR	2.1 km	MPC · JPL
122411	2000 QV_{90}	—	August 25, 2000	Socorro	LINEAR	PHO	1.7 km	MPC · JPL
122412	2000 QV_{91}	—	August 25, 2000	Socorro	LINEAR	EUN	1.9 km	MPC · JPL
122413	2000 QT_{92}	—	August 25, 2000	Socorro	LINEAR	·	2.4 km	MPC · JPL
122414	2000 QO_{93}	—	August 26, 2000	Socorro	LINEAR	·	2.1 km	MPC · JPL
122415	2000 QF_{94}	—	August 26, 2000	Socorro	LINEAR	·	1.9 km	MPC · JPL
122416	2000 QQ_{95}	—	August 26, 2000	Socorro	LINEAR	NYS	2.0 km	MPC · JPL
122417	2000 QG_{96}	—	August 28, 2000	Socorro	LINEAR	NYS	2.1 km	MPC · JPL
122418	2000 QP_{97}	—	August 28, 2000	Socorro	LINEAR	·	1.8 km	MPC · JPL
122419	2000 QB_{99}	—	August 28, 2000	Socorro	LINEAR	·	5.2 km	MPC · JPL
122420	2000 QV_{100}	—	August 28, 2000	Socorro	LINEAR	(5)	2.5 km	MPC · JPL
122421	2000 QZ_{101}	—	August 28, 2000	Socorro	LINEAR	·	1.9 km	MPC · JPL
122422	2000 QN_{102}	—	August 28, 2000	Socorro	LINEAR	·	3.0 km	MPC · JPL
122423	2000 QM_{104}	—	August 28, 2000	Socorro	LINEAR	·	2.4 km	MPC · JPL
122424	2000 QU_{104}	—	August 28, 2000	Socorro	LINEAR	BAR	2.3 km	MPC · JPL
122425	2000 QQ_{107}	—	August 29, 2000	Socorro	LINEAR	CLA	3.2 km	MPC · JPL
122426	2000 QY_{107}	—	August 29, 2000	Socorro	LINEAR	·	2.0 km	MPC · JPL
122427	2000 QE_{108}	—	August 29, 2000	Socorro	LINEAR	·	5.2 km	MPC · JPL
122428	2000 QO_{108}	—	August 29, 2000	Socorro	LINEAR	·	3.3 km	MPC · JPL
122429	2000 QC_{109}	—	August 29, 2000	Socorro	LINEAR	·	1.8 km	MPC · JPL
122430	2000 QM_{111}	—	August 24, 2000	Socorro	LINEAR	·	2.2 km	MPC · JPL
122431	2000 QP_{111}	—	August 24, 2000	Socorro	LINEAR	GEF	2.3 km	MPC · JPL
122432	2000 QL_{114}	—	August 24, 2000	Socorro	LINEAR	·	2.0 km	MPC · JPL
122433	2000 QB_{115}	—	August 24, 2000	Socorro	LINEAR	SUL	3.6 km	MPC · JPL
122434	2000 QO_{115}	—	August 25, 2000	Socorro	LINEAR	·	3.8 km	MPC · JPL
122435	2000 QJ_{120}	—	August 25, 2000	Socorro	LINEAR	(5)	3.2 km	MPC · JPL
122436	2000 QU_{120}	—	August 25, 2000	Socorro	LINEAR	·	1.9 km	MPC · JPL
122437	2000 QW_{120}	—	August 25, 2000	Socorro	LINEAR	·	2.8 km	MPC · JPL
122438	2000 QC_{122}	—	August 25, 2000	Socorro	LINEAR	·	1.6 km	MPC · JPL
122439	2000 QS_{123}	—	August 25, 2000	Socorro	LINEAR	·	2.1 km	MPC · JPL
122440	2000 QV_{125}	—	August 31, 2000	Socorro	LINEAR	(5)	1.3 km	MPC · JPL
122441	2000 QH_{126}	—	August 31, 2000	Socorro	LINEAR	·	2.5 km	MPC · JPL
122442	2000 QU_{131}	—	August 25, 2000	Socorro	LINEAR	JUN	1.8 km	MPC · JPL
122443	2000 QX_{131}	—	August 26, 2000	Socorro	LINEAR	(5)	2.3 km	MPC · JPL
122444	2000 QX_{133}	—	August 26, 2000	Socorro	LINEAR	·	2.1 km	MPC · JPL
122445	2000 QQ_{134}	—	August 26, 2000	Socorro	LINEAR	·	3.4 km	MPC · JPL
122446	2000 QW_{134}	—	August 26, 2000	Socorro	LINEAR	·	2.6 km	MPC · JPL
122447	2000 QA_{136}	—	August 28, 2000	Socorro	LINEAR	·	2.2 km	MPC · JPL
122448	2000 QP_{136}	—	August 29, 2000	Socorro	LINEAR	·	1.9 km	MPC · JPL
122449	2000 QG_{137}	—	August 31, 2000	Socorro	LINEAR	MAR	1.7 km	MPC · JPL
122450	2000 QW_{138}	—	August 31, 2000	Socorro	LINEAR	·	3.9 km	MPC · JPL
122451	2000 QY_{138}	—	August 31, 2000	Socorro	LINEAR	·	2.0 km	MPC · JPL
122452	2000 QO_{139}	—	August 31, 2000	Socorro	LINEAR	·	3.2 km	MPC · JPL
122453	2000 QV_{139}	—	August 31, 2000	Socorro	LINEAR	·	3.0 km	MPC · JPL
122454	2000 QX_{140}	—	August 31, 2000	Socorro	LINEAR	·	2.9 km	MPC · JPL
122455	2000 QK_{141}	—	August 31, 2000	Socorro	LINEAR	·	3.3 km	MPC · JPL
122456	2000 QP_{141}	—	August 31, 2000	Socorro	LINEAR	·	2.5 km	MPC · JPL
122457	2000 QE_{142}	—	August 31, 2000	Socorro	LINEAR	·	2.7 km	MPC · JPL
122458	2000 QV_{144}	—	August 31, 2000	Socorro	LINEAR	NYS	1.3 km	MPC · JPL
122459	2000 QX_{144}	—	August 31, 2000	Socorro	LINEAR	·	1.8 km	MPC · JPL
122460	2000 QB_{146}	—	August 31, 2000	Socorro	LINEAR	L5	20 km	MPC · JPL
122461	2000 QD_{146}	—	August 31, 2000	Socorro	LINEAR	EUN	2.4 km	MPC · JPL
122462	2000 QB_{147}	—	August 31, 2000	Socorro	LINEAR	·	2.1 km	MPC · JPL
122463	2000 QP_{148}	—	August 25, 2000	Socorro	LINEAR	slow	2.5 km	MPC · JPL
122464	2000 QD_{149}	—	August 24, 2000	Socorro	LINEAR	·	2.4 km	MPC · JPL
122465	2000 QY_{149}	—	August 25, 2000	Socorro	LINEAR	·	3.8 km	MPC · JPL
122466	2000 QM_{150}	—	August 25, 2000	Socorro	LINEAR	EUN	2.8 km	MPC · JPL
122467	2000 QC_{151}	—	August 25, 2000	Socorro	LINEAR	·	2.7 km	MPC · JPL
122468	2000 QO_{154}	—	August 31, 2000	Socorro	LINEAR	·	3.4 km	MPC · JPL
122469	2000 QK_{155}	—	August 31, 2000	Socorro	LINEAR	·	4.9 km	MPC · JPL
122470	2000 QQ_{155}	—	August 31, 2000	Socorro	LINEAR	JUN	2.1 km	MPC · JPL
122471	2000 QR_{155}	—	August 31, 2000	Socorro	LINEAR	EUN	2.3 km	MPC · JPL
122472	2000 QY_{156}	—	August 31, 2000	Socorro	LINEAR	·	2.6 km	MPC · JPL
122473	2000 QG_{162}	—	August 31, 2000	Socorro	LINEAR	·	3.7 km	MPC · JPL
122474	2000 QQ_{163}	—	August 31, 2000	Socorro	LINEAR	·	3.0 km	MPC · JPL
122475	2000 QY_{164}	—	August 31, 2000	Socorro	LINEAR	·	3.1 km	MPC · JPL
122476	2000 QL_{165}	—	August 31, 2000	Socorro	LINEAR	·	1.8 km	MPC · JPL
122477	2000 QO_{165}	—	August 31, 2000	Socorro	LINEAR	·	3.2 km	MPC · JPL
122478	2000 QZ_{166}	—	August 31, 2000	Socorro	LINEAR	(5)	1.7 km	MPC · JPL
122479	2000 QH_{167}	—	August 31, 2000	Socorro	LINEAR	·	2.2 km	MPC · JPL
122480	2000 QR_{167}	—	August 31, 2000	Socorro	LINEAR	·	2.3 km	MPC · JPL
122481	2000 QS_{168}	—	August 31, 2000	Socorro	LINEAR	·	3.1 km	MPC · JPL
122482	2000 QB_{169}	—	August 31, 2000	Socorro	LINEAR	·	3.0 km	MPC · JPL
122483	2000 QK_{170}	—	August 31, 2000	Socorro	LINEAR	·	2.9 km	MPC · JPL
122484	2000 QF_{171}	—	August 31, 2000	Socorro	LINEAR	·	2.3 km	MPC · JPL
122485	2000 QK_{171}	—	August 31, 2000	Socorro	LINEAR	·	1.4 km	MPC · JPL
122486	2000 QW_{171}	—	August 31, 2000	Socorro	LINEAR	·	2.8 km	MPC · JPL
122487	2000 QX_{171}	—	August 31, 2000	Socorro	LINEAR	·	2.0 km	MPC · JPL
122488	2000 QJ_{172}	—	August 31, 2000	Socorro	LINEAR	·	3.1 km	MPC · JPL
122489	2000 QZ_{174}	—	August 31, 2000	Socorro	LINEAR	·	2.0 km	MPC · JPL
122490	2000 QF_{175}	—	August 31, 2000	Socorro	LINEAR	·	2.0 km	MPC · JPL
122491	2000 QV_{175}	—	August 31, 2000	Socorro	LINEAR	·	3.2 km	MPC · JPL
122492	2000 QP_{179}	—	August 31, 2000	Socorro	LINEAR	V	1.2 km	MPC · JPL
122493	2000 QJ_{180}	—	August 31, 2000	Socorro	LINEAR	·	2.5 km	MPC · JPL
122494	2000 QS_{180}	—	August 31, 2000	Socorro	LINEAR	GEF	3.2 km	MPC · JPL
122495	2000 QG_{181}	—	August 31, 2000	Socorro	LINEAR	·	7.3 km	MPC · JPL
122496	2000 QM_{184}	—	August 26, 2000	Socorro	LINEAR	·	3.9 km	MPC · JPL
122497	2000 QM_{185}	—	August 26, 2000	Socorro	LINEAR	·	3.1 km	MPC · JPL
122498	2000 QL_{186}	—	August 26, 2000	Socorro	LINEAR	·	1.6 km	MPC · JPL
122499	2000 QC_{190}	—	August 26, 2000	Socorro	LINEAR	MAR	1.6 km	MPC · JPL
122500	2000 QB_{194}	—	August 29, 2000	Socorro	LINEAR	EUN	2.5 km	MPC · JPL

== 122501–122600 ==
back to top

Designation			Discovery			Properties		Ref
Permanent	Provisional	Named after	Date	Site	Discoverer(s)	Category	Diam.	Ref
122501	2000 QJ_{194}	—	August 31, 2000	Socorro	LINEAR	·	3.3 km	MPC · JPL
122502	2000 QO_{195}	—	August 26, 2000	Socorro	LINEAR	·	2.1 km	MPC · JPL
122503	2000 QN_{196}	—	August 29, 2000	Socorro	LINEAR	·	1.6 km	MPC · JPL
122504	2000 QU_{196}	—	August 29, 2000	Socorro	LINEAR	·	1.7 km	MPC · JPL
122505	2000 QB_{197}	—	August 29, 2000	Socorro	LINEAR	·	1.3 km	MPC · JPL
122506	2000 QH_{197}	—	August 29, 2000	Socorro	LINEAR	·	3.1 km	MPC · JPL
122507	2000 QB_{198}	—	August 29, 2000	Socorro	LINEAR	MAS	1.1 km	MPC · JPL
122508	2000 QD_{198}	—	August 29, 2000	Socorro	LINEAR	V	1.1 km	MPC · JPL
122509	2000 QS_{199}	—	August 29, 2000	Socorro	LINEAR	EUN	2.2 km	MPC · JPL
122510	2000 QT_{199}	—	August 29, 2000	Socorro	LINEAR	·	1.4 km	MPC · JPL
122511	2000 QP_{200}	—	August 29, 2000	Socorro	LINEAR	(5)	1.8 km	MPC · JPL
122512	2000 QB_{201}	—	August 29, 2000	Socorro	LINEAR	·	1.6 km	MPC · JPL
122513	2000 QQ_{201}	—	August 29, 2000	Socorro	LINEAR	NYS	2.1 km	MPC · JPL
122514	2000 QW_{202}	—	August 29, 2000	Socorro	LINEAR	·	1.7 km	MPC · JPL
122515	2000 QX_{203}	—	August 29, 2000	Socorro	LINEAR	·	1.5 km	MPC · JPL
122516	2000 QN_{204}	—	August 31, 2000	Socorro	LINEAR	MAS	1.2 km	MPC · JPL
122517	2000 QW_{205}	—	August 31, 2000	Socorro	LINEAR	·	2.5 km	MPC · JPL
122518	2000 QZ_{205}	—	August 31, 2000	Socorro	LINEAR	·	2.3 km	MPC · JPL
122519	2000 QJ_{206}	—	August 31, 2000	Socorro	LINEAR	·	2.4 km	MPC · JPL
122520	2000 QN_{206}	—	August 31, 2000	Socorro	LINEAR	MAR	2.2 km	MPC · JPL
122521	2000 QR_{206}	—	August 31, 2000	Socorro	LINEAR	·	2.5 km	MPC · JPL
122522	2000 QK_{207}	—	August 31, 2000	Socorro	LINEAR	·	4.4 km	MPC · JPL
122523	2000 QV_{207}	—	August 31, 2000	Socorro	LINEAR	·	1.6 km	MPC · JPL
122524	2000 QW_{208}	—	August 31, 2000	Socorro	LINEAR	·	2.5 km	MPC · JPL
122525	2000 QF_{209}	—	August 31, 2000	Socorro	LINEAR	·	3.1 km	MPC · JPL
122526	2000 QM_{209}	—	August 31, 2000	Socorro	LINEAR	NYS	2.0 km	MPC · JPL
122527	2000 QD_{210}	—	August 31, 2000	Socorro	LINEAR	·	2.0 km	MPC · JPL
122528	2000 QP_{210}	—	August 31, 2000	Socorro	LINEAR	MIS	4.1 km	MPC · JPL
122529	2000 QD_{211}	—	August 31, 2000	Socorro	LINEAR	·	1.6 km	MPC · JPL
122530	2000 QP_{211}	—	August 31, 2000	Socorro	LINEAR	·	1.8 km	MPC · JPL
122531	2000 QJ_{212}	—	August 31, 2000	Socorro	LINEAR	·	2.0 km	MPC · JPL
122532	2000 QB_{215}	—	August 31, 2000	Socorro	LINEAR	·	3.6 km	MPC · JPL
122533	2000 QE_{215}	—	August 31, 2000	Socorro	LINEAR	·	3.6 km	MPC · JPL
122534	2000 QL_{215}	—	August 31, 2000	Socorro	LINEAR	MAS	960 m	MPC · JPL
122535	2000 QN_{216}	—	August 31, 2000	Socorro	LINEAR	·	2.1 km	MPC · JPL
122536	2000 QY_{216}	—	August 31, 2000	Socorro	LINEAR	·	2.2 km	MPC · JPL
122537	2000 QX_{218}	—	August 20, 2000	Anderson Mesa	LONEOS	(5)	2.3 km	MPC · JPL
122538	2000 QM_{220}	—	August 21, 2000	Anderson Mesa	LONEOS	·	1.9 km	MPC · JPL
122539	2000 QN_{220}	—	August 21, 2000	Anderson Mesa	LONEOS	(5)	2.5 km	MPC · JPL
122540	2000 QS_{220}	—	August 21, 2000	Anderson Mesa	LONEOS	·	2.7 km	MPC · JPL
122541	2000 QM_{221}	—	August 21, 2000	Anderson Mesa	LONEOS	MAS	1.4 km	MPC · JPL
122542	2000 QJ_{222}	—	August 21, 2000	Anderson Mesa	LONEOS	PHO	3.8 km	MPC · JPL
122543	2000 QX_{223}	—	August 26, 2000	Socorro	LINEAR	V	1.1 km	MPC · JPL
122544	2000 QK_{224}	—	August 26, 2000	Kitt Peak	Spacewatch	V	1.4 km	MPC · JPL
122545	2000 QA_{225}	—	August 29, 2000	Socorro	LINEAR	·	1.8 km	MPC · JPL
122546	2000 QT_{226}	—	August 31, 2000	Socorro	LINEAR	·	7.7 km	MPC · JPL
122547	2000 QC_{228}	—	August 31, 2000	Socorro	LINEAR	·	2.2 km	MPC · JPL
122548	2000 QK_{228}	—	August 31, 2000	Socorro	LINEAR	·	1.7 km	MPC · JPL
122549	2000 QD_{229}	—	August 31, 2000	Socorro	LINEAR	·	2.0 km	MPC · JPL
122550	2000 QH_{230}	—	August 31, 2000	Socorro	LINEAR	·	2.4 km	MPC · JPL
122551	2000 QN_{230}	—	August 31, 2000	Socorro	LINEAR	·	2.6 km	MPC · JPL
122552	2000 QS_{231}	—	August 29, 2000	Socorro	LINEAR	·	1.6 km	MPC · JPL
122553	2000 QH_{244}	—	August 24, 2000	Socorro	LINEAR	·	1.9 km	MPC · JPL
122554 Joséhernández	2000 QS_{244}	Joséhernández	August 25, 2000	Cerro Tololo	M. W. Buie	MAS	1.1 km	MPC · JPL
122555 Auñón-Chancellor	2000 QG_{249}	Auñón-Chancellor	August 28, 2000	Cerro Tololo	M. W. Buie	·	1.4 km	MPC · JPL
122556	2000 QH_{251}	—	August 21, 2000	Anderson Mesa	LONEOS	·	3.2 km	MPC · JPL
122557	2000 QJ_{251}	—	August 24, 2000	Socorro	LINEAR	PHO	1.9 km	MPC · JPL
122558	2000 RA	—	September 1, 2000	Višnjan Observatory	K. Korlević	·	3.9 km	MPC · JPL
122559	2000 RB_{2}	—	September 1, 2000	Socorro	LINEAR	·	2.1 km	MPC · JPL
122560	2000 RO_{2}	—	September 1, 2000	Socorro	LINEAR	·	2.7 km	MPC · JPL
122561	2000 RP_{2}	—	September 1, 2000	Socorro	LINEAR	·	2.9 km	MPC · JPL
122562	2000 RB_{3}	—	September 1, 2000	Socorro	LINEAR	·	2.6 km	MPC · JPL
122563	2000 RG_{5}	—	September 1, 2000	Socorro	LINEAR	·	4.4 km	MPC · JPL
122564	2000 RY_{5}	—	September 1, 2000	Socorro	LINEAR	·	2.8 km	MPC · JPL
122565	2000 RK_{6}	—	September 1, 2000	Socorro	LINEAR	·	2.2 km	MPC · JPL
122566	2000 RM_{6}	—	September 1, 2000	Socorro	LINEAR	EUN	1.9 km	MPC · JPL
122567	2000 RX_{7}	—	September 1, 2000	Socorro	LINEAR	·	2.4 km	MPC · JPL
122568	2000 RL_{8}	—	September 1, 2000	Socorro	LINEAR	PHO	2.2 km	MPC · JPL
122569	2000 RR_{11}	—	September 1, 2000	Socorro	LINEAR	·	2.8 km	MPC · JPL
122570	2000 RG_{12}	—	September 3, 2000	Bisei SG Center	BATTeRS	·	3.4 km	MPC · JPL
122571	2000 RE_{13}	—	September 1, 2000	Socorro	LINEAR	·	2.9 km	MPC · JPL
122572	2000 RT_{13}	—	September 1, 2000	Socorro	LINEAR	·	2.5 km	MPC · JPL
122573	2000 RC_{16}	—	September 1, 2000	Socorro	LINEAR	HNS	3.3 km	MPC · JPL
122574	2000 RG_{16}	—	September 1, 2000	Socorro	LINEAR	V	1.3 km	MPC · JPL
122575	2000 RM_{16}	—	September 1, 2000	Socorro	LINEAR	·	4.0 km	MPC · JPL
122576	2000 RV_{17}	—	September 1, 2000	Socorro	LINEAR	·	2.0 km	MPC · JPL
122577	2000 RH_{18}	—	September 1, 2000	Socorro	LINEAR	EUN	2.8 km	MPC · JPL
122578	2000 RG_{20}	—	September 1, 2000	Socorro	LINEAR	·	2.5 km	MPC · JPL
122579	2000 RQ_{20}	—	September 1, 2000	Socorro	LINEAR	·	2.6 km	MPC · JPL
122580	2000 RG_{23}	—	September 1, 2000	Socorro	LINEAR	·	2.0 km	MPC · JPL
122581	2000 RJ_{24}	—	September 1, 2000	Socorro	LINEAR	L5	17 km	MPC · JPL
122582	2000 RG_{25}	—	September 1, 2000	Socorro	LINEAR	·	4.0 km	MPC · JPL
122583	2000 RV_{25}	—	September 1, 2000	Socorro	LINEAR	·	2.3 km	MPC · JPL
122584	2000 RY_{25}	—	September 1, 2000	Socorro	LINEAR	·	3.3 km	MPC · JPL
122585	2000 RZ_{25}	—	September 1, 2000	Socorro	LINEAR	·	3.3 km	MPC · JPL
122586	2000 RJ_{26}	—	September 1, 2000	Socorro	LINEAR	·	3.2 km	MPC · JPL
122587	2000 RT_{26}	—	September 1, 2000	Socorro	LINEAR	·	2.0 km	MPC · JPL
122588	2000 RE_{27}	—	September 1, 2000	Socorro	LINEAR	EUN	1.8 km	MPC · JPL
122589	2000 RN_{27}	—	September 1, 2000	Socorro	LINEAR	·	3.0 km	MPC · JPL
122590	2000 RB_{28}	—	September 1, 2000	Socorro	LINEAR	·	3.5 km	MPC · JPL
122591	2000 RV_{28}	—	September 1, 2000	Socorro	LINEAR	·	2.5 km	MPC · JPL
122592	2000 RE_{29}	—	September 1, 2000	Socorro	LINEAR	L5	20 km	MPC · JPL
122593	2000 RS_{30}	—	September 1, 2000	Socorro	LINEAR	·	2.2 km	MPC · JPL
122594	2000 RT_{31}	—	September 1, 2000	Socorro	LINEAR	·	1.7 km	MPC · JPL
122595	2000 RB_{34}	—	September 1, 2000	Socorro	LINEAR	NYS	2.6 km	MPC · JPL
122596	2000 RG_{35}	—	September 1, 2000	Socorro	LINEAR	PHO ·	3.2 km	MPC · JPL
122597	2000 RR_{35}	—	September 2, 2000	Socorro	LINEAR	·	3.9 km	MPC · JPL
122598	2000 RN_{37}	—	September 3, 2000	Socorro	LINEAR	·	5.3 km	MPC · JPL
122599	2000 RS_{37}	—	September 3, 2000	Socorro	LINEAR	JUN	2.3 km	MPC · JPL
122600	2000 RE_{38}	—	September 5, 2000	Kvistaberg	Uppsala-DLR Asteroid Survey	NYS	2.0 km	MPC · JPL

== 122601–122700 ==
back to top

Designation			Discovery			Properties		Ref
Permanent	Provisional	Named after	Date	Site	Discoverer(s)	Category	Diam.	Ref
122601	2000 RT_{39}	—	September 1, 2000	Socorro	LINEAR	·	3.8 km	MPC · JPL
122602	2000 RJ_{40}	—	September 3, 2000	Socorro	LINEAR	·	3.1 km	MPC · JPL
122603	2000 RM_{40}	—	September 3, 2000	Socorro	LINEAR	·	3.2 km	MPC · JPL
122604	2000 RP_{41}	—	September 3, 2000	Socorro	LINEAR	DOR	5.3 km	MPC · JPL
122605	2000 RL_{42}	—	September 3, 2000	Socorro	LINEAR	PHO	4.4 km	MPC · JPL
122606	2000 RN_{43}	—	September 3, 2000	Socorro	LINEAR	·	2.7 km	MPC · JPL
122607	2000 RT_{43}	—	September 3, 2000	Socorro	LINEAR	·	3.0 km	MPC · JPL
122608	2000 RF_{46}	—	September 3, 2000	Socorro	LINEAR	·	2.6 km	MPC · JPL
122609	2000 RM_{46}	—	September 3, 2000	Socorro	LINEAR	·	3.0 km	MPC · JPL
122610	2000 RQ_{46}	—	September 3, 2000	Socorro	LINEAR	·	2.6 km	MPC · JPL
122611	2000 RT_{46}	—	September 3, 2000	Socorro	LINEAR	(5)	3.3 km	MPC · JPL
122612	2000 RS_{47}	—	September 3, 2000	Socorro	LINEAR	·	5.0 km	MPC · JPL
122613	2000 RU_{48}	—	September 3, 2000	Socorro	LINEAR	·	4.1 km	MPC · JPL
122614	2000 RF_{49}	—	September 5, 2000	Socorro	LINEAR	EUN	2.2 km	MPC · JPL
122615	2000 RG_{49}	—	September 5, 2000	Socorro	LINEAR	·	2.4 km	MPC · JPL
122616	2000 RG_{51}	—	September 5, 2000	Socorro	LINEAR	·	2.1 km	MPC · JPL
122617	2000 RT_{54}	—	September 3, 2000	Socorro	LINEAR	KRM	6.6 km	MPC · JPL
122618	2000 RT_{55}	—	September 4, 2000	Socorro	LINEAR	GEF	3.8 km	MPC · JPL
122619	2000 RV_{58}	—	September 7, 2000	Kitt Peak	Spacewatch	·	2.4 km	MPC · JPL
122620	2000 RY_{61}	—	September 1, 2000	Socorro	LINEAR	·	4.8 km	MPC · JPL
122621	2000 RL_{63}	—	September 2, 2000	Socorro	LINEAR	·	1.7 km	MPC · JPL
122622	2000 RS_{64}	—	September 1, 2000	Socorro	LINEAR	EUN	2.9 km	MPC · JPL
122623	2000 RK_{67}	—	September 1, 2000	Socorro	LINEAR	slow	2.2 km	MPC · JPL
122624	2000 RJ_{69}	—	September 2, 2000	Socorro	LINEAR	MAS	1.3 km	MPC · JPL
122625	2000 RE_{70}	—	September 2, 2000	Socorro	LINEAR	·	1.8 km	MPC · JPL
122626	2000 RT_{71}	—	September 2, 2000	Socorro	LINEAR	PHO	2.2 km	MPC · JPL
122627	2000 RV_{72}	—	September 2, 2000	Socorro	LINEAR	·	3.0 km	MPC · JPL
122628	2000 RD_{73}	—	September 2, 2000	Socorro	LINEAR	·	2.2 km	MPC · JPL
122629	2000 RD_{77}	—	September 8, 2000	Socorro	LINEAR	·	6.3 km	MPC · JPL
122630	2000 RO_{78}	—	September 8, 2000	Kitt Peak	Spacewatch	·	2.1 km	MPC · JPL
122631	2000 RV_{78}	—	September 10, 2000	Višnjan Observatory	K. Korlević	·	3.4 km	MPC · JPL
122632 Riccioli	2000 RW_{78}	Riccioli	September 5, 2000	Monte Agliale	S. Donati	·	2.8 km	MPC · JPL
122633	2000 RA_{80}	—	September 1, 2000	Socorro	LINEAR	(1547)	2.0 km	MPC · JPL
122634	2000 RY_{80}	—	September 1, 2000	Socorro	LINEAR	·	2.2 km	MPC · JPL
122635	2000 RK_{81}	—	September 1, 2000	Socorro	LINEAR	EUN	2.6 km	MPC · JPL
122636	2000 RZ_{81}	—	September 1, 2000	Socorro	LINEAR	(1547)	3.4 km	MPC · JPL
122637	2000 RA_{82}	—	September 1, 2000	Socorro	LINEAR	·	2.6 km	MPC · JPL
122638	2000 RM_{82}	—	September 1, 2000	Socorro	LINEAR	EUN	2.6 km	MPC · JPL
122639	2000 RN_{82}	—	September 1, 2000	Socorro	LINEAR	·	2.8 km	MPC · JPL
122640	2000 RX_{82}	—	September 1, 2000	Socorro	LINEAR	·	2.3 km	MPC · JPL
122641	2000 RE_{84}	—	September 2, 2000	Anderson Mesa	LONEOS	ADE	2.1 km	MPC · JPL
122642	2000 RK_{84}	—	September 2, 2000	Anderson Mesa	LONEOS	·	2.1 km	MPC · JPL
122643	2000 RO_{84}	—	September 2, 2000	Anderson Mesa	LONEOS	·	2.5 km	MPC · JPL
122644	2000 RP_{84}	—	September 2, 2000	Anderson Mesa	LONEOS	·	2.2 km	MPC · JPL
122645	2000 RC_{86}	—	September 2, 2000	Socorro	LINEAR	·	1.7 km	MPC · JPL
122646	2000 RO_{86}	—	September 2, 2000	Anderson Mesa	LONEOS	EUN	2.1 km	MPC · JPL
122647	2000 RB_{87}	—	September 2, 2000	Anderson Mesa	LONEOS	·	2.2 km	MPC · JPL
122648	2000 RE_{87}	—	September 2, 2000	Anderson Mesa	LONEOS	NYS	2.0 km	MPC · JPL
122649	2000 RX_{87}	—	September 2, 2000	Anderson Mesa	LONEOS	NEM	3.7 km	MPC · JPL
122650	2000 RL_{89}	—	September 3, 2000	Socorro	LINEAR	V	1.4 km	MPC · JPL
122651	2000 RT_{89}	—	September 3, 2000	Socorro	LINEAR	·	2.0 km	MPC · JPL
122652	2000 RH_{90}	—	September 3, 2000	Socorro	LINEAR	·	3.3 km	MPC · JPL
122653	2000 RH_{91}	—	September 3, 2000	Socorro	LINEAR	·	4.4 km	MPC · JPL
122654	2000 RH_{92}	—	September 3, 2000	Socorro	LINEAR	·	4.6 km	MPC · JPL
122655	2000 RN_{93}	—	September 4, 2000	Anderson Mesa	LONEOS	·	1.7 km	MPC · JPL
122656	2000 RV_{93}	—	September 4, 2000	Anderson Mesa	LONEOS	MRX	1.8 km	MPC · JPL
122657	2000 RW_{93}	—	September 4, 2000	Anderson Mesa	LONEOS	·	2.3 km	MPC · JPL
122658	2000 RA_{94}	—	September 4, 2000	Kitt Peak	Spacewatch	·	2.6 km	MPC · JPL
122659	2000 RM_{97}	—	September 5, 2000	Anderson Mesa	LONEOS	EUN · slow	3.6 km	MPC · JPL
122660	2000 RE_{98}	—	September 5, 2000	Anderson Mesa	LONEOS	EUN	2.8 km	MPC · JPL
122661	2000 RH_{98}	—	September 5, 2000	Anderson Mesa	LONEOS	PHO	5.4 km	MPC · JPL
122662	2000 RK_{98}	—	September 5, 2000	Anderson Mesa	LONEOS	HNS	3.1 km	MPC · JPL
122663	2000 RX_{98}	—	September 5, 2000	Anderson Mesa	LONEOS	·	2.4 km	MPC · JPL
122664	2000 RZ_{98}	—	September 5, 2000	Anderson Mesa	LONEOS	·	3.3 km	MPC · JPL
122665	2000 RS_{99}	—	September 5, 2000	Anderson Mesa	LONEOS	·	2.4 km	MPC · JPL
122666	2000 RX_{99}	—	September 5, 2000	Anderson Mesa	LONEOS	·	2.4 km	MPC · JPL
122667	2000 RU_{100}	—	September 5, 2000	Anderson Mesa	LONEOS	·	3.3 km	MPC · JPL
122668	2000 RB_{101}	—	September 5, 2000	Anderson Mesa	LONEOS	·	4.8 km	MPC · JPL
122669	2000 RN_{101}	—	September 5, 2000	Anderson Mesa	LONEOS	·	3.4 km	MPC · JPL
122670	2000 RU_{101}	—	September 5, 2000	Anderson Mesa	LONEOS	ADE	5.4 km	MPC · JPL
122671	2000 RY_{101}	—	September 5, 2000	Anderson Mesa	LONEOS	·	4.0 km	MPC · JPL
122672	2000 RP_{102}	—	September 5, 2000	Anderson Mesa	LONEOS	EUN · slow	2.8 km	MPC · JPL
122673	2000 RZ_{102}	—	September 5, 2000	Anderson Mesa	LONEOS	EUN	2.2 km	MPC · JPL
122674	2000 RG_{103}	—	September 5, 2000	Anderson Mesa	LONEOS	·	2.3 km	MPC · JPL
122675	2000 RL_{103}	—	September 5, 2000	Anderson Mesa	LONEOS	·	2.4 km	MPC · JPL
122676	2000 RS_{103}	—	September 6, 2000	Socorro	LINEAR	·	4.1 km	MPC · JPL
122677	2000 RG_{104}	—	September 6, 2000	Socorro	LINEAR	EUN	2.1 km	MPC · JPL
122678	2000 RK_{104}	—	September 6, 2000	Socorro	LINEAR	·	2.4 km	MPC · JPL
122679	2000 RQ_{104}	—	September 6, 2000	Socorro	LINEAR	·	2.8 km	MPC · JPL
122680	2000 RX_{105}	—	September 4, 2000	Anderson Mesa	LONEOS	·	3.1 km	MPC · JPL
122681	2000 SW	—	September 19, 2000	Kitt Peak	Spacewatch	NYS	1.8 km	MPC · JPL
122682	2000 SG_{1}	—	September 18, 2000	Socorro	LINEAR	·	5.9 km	MPC · JPL
122683	2000 SH_{1}	—	September 18, 2000	Socorro	LINEAR	PHO	10 km	MPC · JPL
122684	2000 SJ_{3}	—	September 20, 2000	Socorro	LINEAR	·	1.7 km	MPC · JPL
122685	2000 SP_{3}	—	September 20, 2000	Socorro	LINEAR	·	3.4 km	MPC · JPL
122686	2000 SW_{3}	—	September 20, 2000	Socorro	LINEAR	KRM	4.7 km	MPC · JPL
122687	2000 SX_{3}	—	September 20, 2000	Socorro	LINEAR	·	3.0 km	MPC · JPL
122688	2000 SK_{7}	—	September 20, 2000	Kitt Peak	Spacewatch	(5)	2.7 km	MPC · JPL
122689	2000 SO_{7}	—	September 22, 2000	Kitt Peak	Spacewatch	V	1.3 km	MPC · JPL
122690	2000 SC_{11}	—	September 23, 2000	Socorro	LINEAR	HNS	2.1 km	MPC · JPL
122691	2000 SP_{11}	—	September 24, 2000	Višnjan Observatory	K. Korlević	NYS	1.8 km	MPC · JPL
122692	2000 SC_{12}	—	September 20, 2000	Socorro	LINEAR	·	1.7 km	MPC · JPL
122693	2000 SE_{12}	—	September 20, 2000	Socorro	LINEAR	·	1.9 km	MPC · JPL
122694	2000 SQ_{12}	—	September 20, 2000	Socorro	LINEAR	·	1.9 km	MPC · JPL
122695	2000 SY_{13}	—	September 22, 2000	Socorro	LINEAR	·	2.2 km	MPC · JPL
122696	2000 SC_{16}	—	September 23, 2000	Socorro	LINEAR	·	2.7 km	MPC · JPL
122697	2000 SL_{16}	—	September 23, 2000	Socorro	LINEAR	·	2.0 km	MPC · JPL
122698	2000 SW_{16}	—	September 23, 2000	Socorro	LINEAR	·	2.6 km	MPC · JPL
122699	2000 SX_{19}	—	September 23, 2000	Socorro	LINEAR	·	4.5 km	MPC · JPL
122700	2000 SA_{20}	—	September 23, 2000	Socorro	LINEAR	·	2.6 km	MPC · JPL

== 122701–122800 ==
back to top

Designation			Discovery			Properties		Ref
Permanent	Provisional	Named after	Date	Site	Discoverer(s)	Category	Diam.	Ref
122701	2000 SM_{22}	—	September 20, 2000	Haleakala	NEAT	(5)	1.9 km	MPC · JPL
122702	2000 SV_{24}	—	September 26, 2000	Bisei SG Center	BATTeRS	(5)	2.4 km	MPC · JPL
122703	2000 SQ_{27}	—	September 23, 2000	Socorro	LINEAR	NEM	3.9 km	MPC · JPL
122704	2000 SL_{29}	—	September 24, 2000	Socorro	LINEAR	·	3.2 km	MPC · JPL
122705	2000 SU_{29}	—	September 24, 2000	Socorro	LINEAR	PAD	2.6 km	MPC · JPL
122706	2000 SA_{30}	—	September 24, 2000	Socorro	LINEAR	MRX	1.7 km	MPC · JPL
122707	2000 SQ_{30}	—	September 24, 2000	Socorro	LINEAR	·	2.0 km	MPC · JPL
122708	2000 SR_{30}	—	September 24, 2000	Socorro	LINEAR	·	1.8 km	MPC · JPL
122709	2000 SF_{31}	—	September 24, 2000	Socorro	LINEAR	·	3.0 km	MPC · JPL
122710	2000 SY_{31}	—	September 24, 2000	Socorro	LINEAR	·	3.3 km	MPC · JPL
122711	2000 SM_{32}	—	September 24, 2000	Socorro	LINEAR	KON	3.6 km	MPC · JPL
122712	2000 SS_{32}	—	September 24, 2000	Socorro	LINEAR	·	1.6 km	MPC · JPL
122713	2000 SV_{32}	—	September 24, 2000	Socorro	LINEAR	PAD	3.1 km	MPC · JPL
122714	2000 SG_{33}	—	September 24, 2000	Socorro	LINEAR	·	1.9 km	MPC · JPL
122715	2000 SO_{33}	—	September 24, 2000	Socorro	LINEAR	·	2.1 km	MPC · JPL
122716	2000 SN_{35}	—	September 24, 2000	Socorro	LINEAR	·	3.5 km	MPC · JPL
122717	2000 SH_{36}	—	September 24, 2000	Socorro	LINEAR	(21344)	2.8 km	MPC · JPL
122718	2000 SH_{37}	—	September 24, 2000	Socorro	LINEAR	·	3.5 km	MPC · JPL
122719	2000 SX_{37}	—	September 24, 2000	Socorro	LINEAR	·	2.1 km	MPC · JPL
122720	2000 SD_{39}	—	September 24, 2000	Socorro	LINEAR	·	7.9 km	MPC · JPL
122721	2000 SG_{39}	—	September 24, 2000	Socorro	LINEAR	·	1.9 km	MPC · JPL
122722	2000 SA_{40}	—	September 24, 2000	Socorro	LINEAR	NEM	4.5 km	MPC · JPL
122723	2000 SC_{40}	—	September 24, 2000	Socorro	LINEAR	·	2.5 km	MPC · JPL
122724	2000 SJ_{41}	—	September 24, 2000	Socorro	LINEAR	·	2.2 km	MPC · JPL
122725	2000 SX_{41}	—	September 24, 2000	Socorro	LINEAR	·	1.5 km	MPC · JPL
122726	2000 SB_{43}	—	September 26, 2000	Črni Vrh	Mikuž, H.	PHO	9.9 km	MPC · JPL
122727	2000 SD_{43}	—	September 26, 2000	Črni Vrh	Mikuž, H.	NYS	2.1 km	MPC · JPL
122728	2000 SJ_{43}	—	September 26, 2000	Črni Vrh	Matičič, S.	·	3.9 km	MPC · JPL
122729	2000 SL_{43}	—	September 22, 2000	Bergisch Gladbach	W. Bickel	·	1.4 km	MPC · JPL
122730	2000 SO_{45}	—	September 22, 2000	Socorro	LINEAR	PHO	4.3 km	MPC · JPL
122731	2000 SA_{46}	—	September 22, 2000	Socorro	LINEAR	·	2.9 km	MPC · JPL
122732	2000 SY_{46}	—	September 23, 2000	Socorro	LINEAR	ADE	3.9 km	MPC · JPL
122733	2000 SK_{47}	—	September 23, 2000	Socorro	LINEAR	L5 · slow	15 km	MPC · JPL
122734	2000 SL_{49}	—	September 23, 2000	Socorro	LINEAR	V	1.2 km	MPC · JPL
122735	2000 SW_{49}	—	September 23, 2000	Socorro	LINEAR	·	1.7 km	MPC · JPL
122736	2000 SY_{49}	—	September 23, 2000	Socorro	LINEAR	·	2.4 km	MPC · JPL
122737	2000 SC_{50}	—	September 23, 2000	Socorro	LINEAR	·	2.2 km	MPC · JPL
122738	2000 SA_{52}	—	September 23, 2000	Socorro	LINEAR	·	1.8 km	MPC · JPL
122739	2000 ST_{52}	—	September 24, 2000	Socorro	LINEAR	(5)	3.4 km	MPC · JPL
122740	2000 SY_{53}	—	September 24, 2000	Socorro	LINEAR	·	2.1 km	MPC · JPL
122741	2000 SZ_{53}	—	September 24, 2000	Socorro	LINEAR	·	3.8 km	MPC · JPL
122742	2000 SC_{54}	—	September 24, 2000	Socorro	LINEAR	·	2.6 km	MPC · JPL
122743	2000 SR_{54}	—	September 24, 2000	Socorro	LINEAR	MAR	1.7 km	MPC · JPL
122744	2000 SX_{54}	—	September 24, 2000	Socorro	LINEAR	MAS	1.0 km	MPC · JPL
122745	2000 SC_{55}	—	September 24, 2000	Socorro	LINEAR	·	3.2 km	MPC · JPL
122746	2000 SD_{55}	—	September 24, 2000	Socorro	LINEAR	KOR	3.0 km	MPC · JPL
122747	2000 ST_{55}	—	September 24, 2000	Socorro	LINEAR	·	2.2 km	MPC · JPL
122748	2000 SX_{56}	—	September 24, 2000	Socorro	LINEAR	·	1.7 km	MPC · JPL
122749	2000 SG_{59}	—	September 24, 2000	Socorro	LINEAR	HOF	5.0 km	MPC · JPL
122750	2000 SA_{60}	—	September 24, 2000	Socorro	LINEAR	·	2.2 km	MPC · JPL
122751	2000 SL_{61}	—	September 24, 2000	Socorro	LINEAR	(5)	1.6 km	MPC · JPL
122752	2000 SY_{61}	—	September 24, 2000	Socorro	LINEAR	V	1.6 km	MPC · JPL
122753	2000 SB_{62}	—	September 24, 2000	Socorro	LINEAR	·	3.0 km	MPC · JPL
122754	2000 SM_{62}	—	September 24, 2000	Socorro	LINEAR	·	4.1 km	MPC · JPL
122755	2000 SO_{62}	—	September 24, 2000	Socorro	LINEAR	·	1.7 km	MPC · JPL
122756	2000 SR_{63}	—	September 24, 2000	Socorro	LINEAR	·	1.8 km	MPC · JPL
122757	2000 SP_{64}	—	September 24, 2000	Socorro	LINEAR	·	2.0 km	MPC · JPL
122758	2000 SD_{65}	—	September 24, 2000	Socorro	LINEAR	(5)	1.4 km	MPC · JPL
122759	2000 SQ_{65}	—	September 24, 2000	Socorro	LINEAR	·	4.8 km	MPC · JPL
122760	2000 SE_{66}	—	September 24, 2000	Socorro	LINEAR	·	2.3 km	MPC · JPL
122761	2000 SZ_{66}	—	September 24, 2000	Socorro	LINEAR	KOR	2.2 km	MPC · JPL
122762	2000 SU_{67}	—	September 24, 2000	Socorro	LINEAR	NYS	1.9 km	MPC · JPL
122763	2000 SW_{69}	—	September 24, 2000	Socorro	LINEAR	·	3.6 km	MPC · JPL
122764	2000 SX_{69}	—	September 24, 2000	Socorro	LINEAR	NYS	2.2 km	MPC · JPL
122765	2000 SE_{71}	—	September 24, 2000	Socorro	LINEAR	(5)	2.6 km	MPC · JPL
122766	2000 SG_{71}	—	September 24, 2000	Socorro	LINEAR	·	4.4 km	MPC · JPL
122767	2000 SJ_{71}	—	September 24, 2000	Socorro	LINEAR	·	1.7 km	MPC · JPL
122768	2000 SQ_{73}	—	September 24, 2000	Socorro	LINEAR	·	2.7 km	MPC · JPL
122769	2000 SE_{74}	—	September 24, 2000	Socorro	LINEAR	·	1.9 km	MPC · JPL
122770	2000 SB_{75}	—	September 24, 2000	Socorro	LINEAR	·	3.3 km	MPC · JPL
122771	2000 SF_{75}	—	September 24, 2000	Socorro	LINEAR	·	2.6 km	MPC · JPL
122772	2000 SB_{76}	—	September 24, 2000	Socorro	LINEAR	·	3.5 km	MPC · JPL
122773	2000 SK_{77}	—	September 24, 2000	Socorro	LINEAR	·	4.2 km	MPC · JPL
122774	2000 SV_{78}	—	September 24, 2000	Socorro	LINEAR	NYS	2.1 km	MPC · JPL
122775	2000 SA_{79}	—	September 24, 2000	Socorro	LINEAR	·	3.2 km	MPC · JPL
122776	2000 SP_{79}	—	September 24, 2000	Socorro	LINEAR	·	1.7 km	MPC · JPL
122777	2000 SX_{79}	—	September 24, 2000	Socorro	LINEAR	·	3.0 km	MPC · JPL
122778	2000 SL_{80}	—	September 24, 2000	Socorro	LINEAR	·	2.3 km	MPC · JPL
122779	2000 SX_{80}	—	September 24, 2000	Socorro	LINEAR	·	2.5 km	MPC · JPL
122780	2000 ST_{82}	—	September 24, 2000	Socorro	LINEAR	·	3.0 km	MPC · JPL
122781	2000 SJ_{84}	—	September 24, 2000	Socorro	LINEAR	·	2.2 km	MPC · JPL
122782	2000 SU_{84}	—	September 24, 2000	Socorro	LINEAR	·	3.7 km	MPC · JPL
122783	2000 SY_{85}	—	September 24, 2000	Socorro	LINEAR	·	1.6 km	MPC · JPL
122784	2000 SO_{87}	—	September 24, 2000	Socorro	LINEAR	·	2.9 km	MPC · JPL
122785	2000 SQ_{87}	—	September 24, 2000	Socorro	LINEAR	·	3.0 km	MPC · JPL
122786	2000 SE_{89}	—	September 25, 2000	Socorro	LINEAR	EUN	2.0 km	MPC · JPL
122787	2000 SF_{90}	—	September 22, 2000	Socorro	LINEAR	PHO	1.9 km	MPC · JPL
122788	2000 SE_{91}	—	September 23, 2000	Socorro	LINEAR	EUN	2.3 km	MPC · JPL
122789	2000 SP_{91}	—	September 23, 2000	Socorro	LINEAR	·	2.4 km	MPC · JPL
122790	2000 SY_{91}	—	September 23, 2000	Socorro	LINEAR	JUN	3.1 km	MPC · JPL
122791	2000 SJ_{92}	—	September 23, 2000	Socorro	LINEAR	·	2.4 km	MPC · JPL
122792	2000 SX_{92}	—	September 23, 2000	Socorro	LINEAR	·	3.2 km	MPC · JPL
122793	2000 SQ_{93}	—	September 23, 2000	Socorro	LINEAR	·	3.6 km	MPC · JPL
122794	2000 ST_{93}	—	September 23, 2000	Socorro	LINEAR	EUN	2.1 km	MPC · JPL
122795	2000 SL_{94}	—	September 23, 2000	Socorro	LINEAR	·	3.4 km	MPC · JPL
122796	2000 SO_{94}	—	September 23, 2000	Socorro	LINEAR	·	5.7 km	MPC · JPL
122797	2000 SG_{95}	—	September 23, 2000	Socorro	LINEAR	·	2.7 km	MPC · JPL
122798	2000 SJ_{95}	—	September 23, 2000	Socorro	LINEAR	·	2.2 km	MPC · JPL
122799	2000 SZ_{95}	—	September 23, 2000	Socorro	LINEAR	·	1.9 km	MPC · JPL
122800	2000 SJ_{96}	—	September 23, 2000	Socorro	LINEAR	·	2.1 km	MPC · JPL

== 122801–122900 ==
back to top

Designation			Discovery			Properties		Ref
Permanent	Provisional	Named after	Date	Site	Discoverer(s)	Category	Diam.	Ref
122801	2000 SS_{96}	—	September 23, 2000	Socorro	LINEAR	·	2.4 km	MPC · JPL
122802	2000 SS_{97}	—	September 23, 2000	Socorro	LINEAR	·	3.1 km	MPC · JPL
122803	2000 SN_{98}	—	September 23, 2000	Socorro	LINEAR	·	3.1 km	MPC · JPL
122804	2000 SG_{99}	—	September 23, 2000	Socorro	LINEAR	·	2.2 km	MPC · JPL
122805	2000 SP_{99}	—	September 23, 2000	Socorro	LINEAR	·	3.7 km	MPC · JPL
122806	2000 SR_{99}	—	September 23, 2000	Socorro	LINEAR	·	3.1 km	MPC · JPL
122807	2000 SS_{99}	—	September 23, 2000	Socorro	LINEAR	·	1.8 km	MPC · JPL
122808	2000 SW_{99}	—	September 23, 2000	Socorro	LINEAR	V	1.2 km	MPC · JPL
122809	2000 SB_{100}	—	September 23, 2000	Socorro	LINEAR	HOF	4.9 km	MPC · JPL
122810	2000 SS_{100}	—	September 23, 2000	Socorro	LINEAR	·	4.1 km	MPC · JPL
122811	2000 SK_{101}	—	September 24, 2000	Socorro	LINEAR	·	2.6 km	MPC · JPL
122812	2000 SO_{101}	—	September 24, 2000	Socorro	LINEAR	V	1.1 km	MPC · JPL
122813	2000 SU_{102}	—	September 24, 2000	Socorro	LINEAR	·	3.5 km	MPC · JPL
122814	2000 SN_{103}	—	September 24, 2000	Socorro	LINEAR	NYS ·	3.0 km	MPC · JPL
122815	2000 SS_{103}	—	September 24, 2000	Socorro	LINEAR	·	4.2 km	MPC · JPL
122816	2000 SE_{104}	—	September 24, 2000	Socorro	LINEAR	·	3.5 km	MPC · JPL
122817	2000 SR_{104}	—	September 24, 2000	Socorro	LINEAR	·	2.0 km	MPC · JPL
122818	2000 SH_{105}	—	September 24, 2000	Socorro	LINEAR	·	5.3 km	MPC · JPL
122819	2000 SS_{105}	—	September 24, 2000	Socorro	LINEAR	·	3.7 km	MPC · JPL
122820	2000 SQ_{106}	—	September 24, 2000	Socorro	LINEAR	·	2.1 km	MPC · JPL
122821	2000 SA_{107}	—	September 24, 2000	Socorro	LINEAR	·	2.7 km	MPC · JPL
122822	2000 SC_{107}	—	September 24, 2000	Socorro	LINEAR	(5)	2.6 km	MPC · JPL
122823	2000 SG_{107}	—	September 24, 2000	Socorro	LINEAR	SUL	3.0 km	MPC · JPL
122824	2000 SK_{107}	—	September 24, 2000	Socorro	LINEAR	NYS ·	3.8 km	MPC · JPL
122825	2000 SQ_{107}	—	September 24, 2000	Socorro	LINEAR	·	2.3 km	MPC · JPL
122826	2000 SB_{108}	—	September 24, 2000	Socorro	LINEAR	·	2.1 km	MPC · JPL
122827	2000 SU_{108}	—	September 24, 2000	Socorro	LINEAR	·	3.6 km	MPC · JPL
122828	2000 SC_{109}	—	September 24, 2000	Socorro	LINEAR	·	3.0 km	MPC · JPL
122829	2000 SL_{110}	—	September 24, 2000	Socorro	LINEAR	NYS	1.8 km	MPC · JPL
122830	2000 SY_{110}	—	September 24, 2000	Socorro	LINEAR	V	1.6 km	MPC · JPL
122831	2000 ST_{112}	—	September 24, 2000	Socorro	LINEAR	·	2.4 km	MPC · JPL
122832	2000 SK_{113}	—	September 24, 2000	Socorro	LINEAR	·	2.4 km	MPC · JPL
122833	2000 SV_{115}	—	September 24, 2000	Socorro	LINEAR	(5)	2.2 km	MPC · JPL
122834	2000 SL_{116}	—	September 24, 2000	Socorro	LINEAR	NYS	1.9 km	MPC · JPL
122835	2000 SO_{116}	—	September 24, 2000	Socorro	LINEAR	·	2.1 km	MPC · JPL
122836	2000 SO_{117}	—	September 24, 2000	Socorro	LINEAR	·	1.6 km	MPC · JPL
122837	2000 SO_{119}	—	September 24, 2000	Socorro	LINEAR	·	2.5 km	MPC · JPL
122838	2000 SQ_{120}	—	September 24, 2000	Socorro	LINEAR	·	2.5 km	MPC · JPL
122839	2000 SU_{120}	—	September 24, 2000	Socorro	LINEAR	·	4.0 km	MPC · JPL
122840	2000 SH_{121}	—	September 24, 2000	Socorro	LINEAR	JUN	5.4 km	MPC · JPL
122841	2000 SY_{121}	—	September 24, 2000	Socorro	LINEAR	(5)	2.5 km	MPC · JPL
122842	2000 SC_{122}	—	September 24, 2000	Socorro	LINEAR	·	6.9 km	MPC · JPL
122843	2000 SL_{124}	—	September 24, 2000	Socorro	LINEAR	·	4.7 km	MPC · JPL
122844	2000 ST_{125}	—	September 24, 2000	Socorro	LINEAR	·	1.8 km	MPC · JPL
122845	2000 SM_{126}	—	September 24, 2000	Socorro	LINEAR	·	2.2 km	MPC · JPL
122846	2000 SY_{126}	—	September 24, 2000	Socorro	LINEAR	(5)	2.4 km	MPC · JPL
122847	2000 SK_{127}	—	September 24, 2000	Socorro	LINEAR	·	1.8 km	MPC · JPL
122848	2000 SU_{127}	—	September 24, 2000	Socorro	LINEAR	·	2.9 km	MPC · JPL
122849	2000 SC_{128}	—	September 24, 2000	Socorro	LINEAR	·	2.9 km	MPC · JPL
122850	2000 SL_{129}	—	September 22, 2000	Socorro	LINEAR	·	3.3 km	MPC · JPL
122851	2000 ST_{129}	—	September 22, 2000	Socorro	LINEAR	EUN	2.8 km	MPC · JPL
122852	2000 ST_{130}	—	September 22, 2000	Socorro	LINEAR	PHO	2.7 km	MPC · JPL
122853	2000 SD_{131}	—	September 22, 2000	Socorro	LINEAR	·	3.8 km	MPC · JPL
122854	2000 SP_{131}	—	September 22, 2000	Socorro	LINEAR	MAR	2.1 km	MPC · JPL
122855	2000 SQ_{131}	—	September 22, 2000	Socorro	LINEAR	HNS	2.0 km	MPC · JPL
122856	2000 SS_{131}	—	September 22, 2000	Socorro	LINEAR	·	2.6 km	MPC · JPL
122857	2000 SK_{132}	—	September 22, 2000	Socorro	LINEAR	·	3.4 km	MPC · JPL
122858	2000 SL_{132}	—	September 22, 2000	Socorro	LINEAR	·	2.4 km	MPC · JPL
122859	2000 SP_{132}	—	September 22, 2000	Socorro	LINEAR	·	4.6 km	MPC · JPL
122860	2000 ST_{132}	—	September 23, 2000	Socorro	LINEAR	L5	20 km	MPC · JPL
122861	2000 SZ_{133}	—	September 23, 2000	Socorro	LINEAR	·	3.0 km	MPC · JPL
122862	2000 SJ_{134}	—	September 23, 2000	Socorro	LINEAR	L5	13 km	MPC · JPL
122863	2000 SY_{134}	—	September 23, 2000	Socorro	LINEAR	slow	1.4 km	MPC · JPL
122864	2000 SJ_{135}	—	September 23, 2000	Socorro	LINEAR	·	3.8 km	MPC · JPL
122865	2000 SX_{135}	—	September 23, 2000	Socorro	LINEAR	·	1.8 km	MPC · JPL
122866	2000 SD_{136}	—	September 23, 2000	Socorro	LINEAR	·	2.5 km	MPC · JPL
122867	2000 SG_{136}	—	September 23, 2000	Socorro	LINEAR	·	2.4 km	MPC · JPL
122868	2000 SY_{136}	—	September 23, 2000	Socorro	LINEAR	·	3.8 km	MPC · JPL
122869	2000 SB_{137}	—	September 23, 2000	Socorro	LINEAR	EUN	2.9 km	MPC · JPL
122870	2000 SW_{137}	—	September 23, 2000	Socorro	LINEAR	·	1.9 km	MPC · JPL
122871	2000 SX_{138}	—	September 23, 2000	Socorro	LINEAR	SUL	4.8 km	MPC · JPL
122872	2000 SB_{139}	—	September 23, 2000	Socorro	LINEAR	·	2.4 km	MPC · JPL
122873	2000 SK_{139}	—	September 23, 2000	Socorro	LINEAR	·	2.0 km	MPC · JPL
122874	2000 SY_{139}	—	September 23, 2000	Socorro	LINEAR	·	3.6 km	MPC · JPL
122875	2000 SB_{140}	—	September 23, 2000	Socorro	LINEAR	·	3.8 km	MPC · JPL
122876	2000 SV_{140}	—	September 23, 2000	Socorro	LINEAR	·	4.3 km	MPC · JPL
122877	2000 SP_{141}	—	September 23, 2000	Socorro	LINEAR	V	1.7 km	MPC · JPL
122878	2000 ST_{141}	—	September 23, 2000	Socorro	LINEAR	·	4.5 km	MPC · JPL
122879	2000 SK_{143}	—	September 23, 2000	Socorro	LINEAR	·	2.8 km	MPC · JPL
122880	2000 SP_{143}	—	September 24, 2000	Socorro	LINEAR	·	2.6 km	MPC · JPL
122881	2000 SB_{145}	—	September 24, 2000	Socorro	LINEAR	NYS	1.9 km	MPC · JPL
122882	2000 SJ_{145}	—	September 24, 2000	Socorro	LINEAR	·	2.3 km	MPC · JPL
122883	2000 SL_{145}	—	September 24, 2000	Socorro	LINEAR	·	1.9 km	MPC · JPL
122884	2000 SQ_{145}	—	September 24, 2000	Socorro	LINEAR	·	3.5 km	MPC · JPL
122885	2000 SA_{146}	—	September 24, 2000	Socorro	LINEAR	·	1.6 km	MPC · JPL
122886	2000 SD_{146}	—	September 24, 2000	Socorro	LINEAR	(5)	1.8 km	MPC · JPL
122887	2000 SF_{148}	—	September 24, 2000	Socorro	LINEAR	·	3.4 km	MPC · JPL
122888	2000 SQ_{149}	—	September 24, 2000	Socorro	LINEAR	·	2.2 km	MPC · JPL
122889	2000 SU_{149}	—	September 24, 2000	Socorro	LINEAR	·	3.1 km	MPC · JPL
122890	2000 SN_{150}	—	September 24, 2000	Socorro	LINEAR	·	4.2 km	MPC · JPL
122891	2000 SF_{152}	—	September 24, 2000	Socorro	LINEAR	·	2.4 km	MPC · JPL
122892	2000 SU_{152}	—	September 24, 2000	Socorro	LINEAR	·	2.5 km	MPC · JPL
122893	2000 SF_{154}	—	September 24, 2000	Socorro	LINEAR	GEF	2.8 km	MPC · JPL
122894	2000 SS_{155}	—	September 24, 2000	Socorro	LINEAR	·	2.2 km	MPC · JPL
122895	2000 SB_{156}	—	September 24, 2000	Socorro	LINEAR	(5)	2.1 km	MPC · JPL
122896	2000 SL_{156}	—	September 24, 2000	Socorro	LINEAR	·	8.5 km	MPC · JPL
122897	2000 SO_{156}	—	September 24, 2000	Socorro	LINEAR	AGN	2.4 km	MPC · JPL
122898	2000 SU_{157}	—	September 27, 2000	Socorro	LINEAR	·	2.2 km	MPC · JPL
122899	2000 SX_{157}	—	September 27, 2000	Socorro	LINEAR	BRA	3.0 km	MPC · JPL
122900	2000 SB_{158}	—	September 27, 2000	Socorro	LINEAR	·	2.9 km	MPC · JPL

== 122901–123000 ==
back to top

Designation			Discovery			Properties		Ref
Permanent	Provisional	Named after	Date	Site	Discoverer(s)	Category	Diam.	Ref
122901	2000 SO_{161}	—	September 19, 2000	Haleakala	NEAT	·	2.8 km	MPC · JPL
122902	2000 SN_{162}	—	September 21, 2000	Haleakala	NEAT	·	2.4 km	MPC · JPL
122903	2000 SG_{165}	—	September 23, 2000	Socorro	LINEAR	·	4.0 km	MPC · JPL
122904	2000 SR_{165}	—	September 23, 2000	Socorro	LINEAR	·	3.3 km	MPC · JPL
122905	2000 SU_{165}	—	September 23, 2000	Socorro	LINEAR	·	2.9 km	MPC · JPL
122906	2000 SW_{165}	—	September 23, 2000	Socorro	LINEAR	·	3.7 km	MPC · JPL
122907	2000 SC_{166}	—	September 23, 2000	Socorro	LINEAR	·	4.9 km	MPC · JPL
122908	2000 SM_{166}	—	September 23, 2000	Socorro	LINEAR	RAF	1.4 km	MPC · JPL
122909	2000 SZ_{166}	—	September 23, 2000	Socorro	LINEAR	·	4.0 km	MPC · JPL
122910	2000 SR_{167}	—	September 23, 2000	Socorro	LINEAR	·	2.2 km	MPC · JPL
122911	2000 SX_{167}	—	September 23, 2000	Socorro	LINEAR	·	2.0 km	MPC · JPL
122912	2000 SL_{168}	—	September 23, 2000	Socorro	LINEAR	·	5.2 km	MPC · JPL
122913	2000 SV_{168}	—	September 23, 2000	Socorro	LINEAR	·	2.1 km	MPC · JPL
122914	2000 SL_{169}	—	September 23, 2000	Socorro	LINEAR	EUN	3.3 km	MPC · JPL
122915	2000 SZ_{171}	—	September 27, 2000	Socorro	LINEAR	·	3.4 km	MPC · JPL
122916	2000 SY_{172}	—	September 28, 2000	Socorro	LINEAR	·	7.9 km	MPC · JPL
122917	2000 SF_{173}	—	September 28, 2000	Socorro	LINEAR	·	4.4 km	MPC · JPL
122918	2000 SN_{173}	—	September 28, 2000	Socorro	LINEAR	·	3.0 km	MPC · JPL
122919	2000 SU_{173}	—	September 28, 2000	Socorro	LINEAR	EUN	2.9 km	MPC · JPL
122920	2000 SC_{174}	—	September 28, 2000	Socorro	LINEAR	·	1.9 km	MPC · JPL
122921	2000 SM_{174}	—	September 28, 2000	Socorro	LINEAR	·	3.2 km	MPC · JPL
122922	2000 SN_{174}	—	September 28, 2000	Socorro	LINEAR	·	2.8 km	MPC · JPL
122923	2000 SV_{174}	—	September 28, 2000	Socorro	LINEAR	·	2.2 km	MPC · JPL
122924	2000 SG_{175}	—	September 28, 2000	Socorro	LINEAR	·	2.0 km	MPC · JPL
122925	2000 SN_{175}	—	September 28, 2000	Socorro	LINEAR	·	2.3 km	MPC · JPL
122926	2000 SZ_{175}	—	September 28, 2000	Socorro	LINEAR	·	2.9 km	MPC · JPL
122927	2000 SD_{176}	—	September 28, 2000	Socorro	LINEAR	·	5.2 km	MPC · JPL
122928	2000 SG_{177}	—	September 28, 2000	Socorro	LINEAR	V	1.3 km	MPC · JPL
122929	2000 SO_{177}	—	September 28, 2000	Socorro	LINEAR	·	4.2 km	MPC · JPL
122930	2000 SV_{181}	—	September 19, 2000	Haleakala	NEAT	(5)	2.0 km	MPC · JPL
122931	2000 SM_{183}	—	September 20, 2000	Haleakala	NEAT	V	1.4 km	MPC · JPL
122932	2000 SU_{183}	—	September 20, 2000	Haleakala	NEAT	·	2.0 km	MPC · JPL
122933	2000 SB_{184}	—	September 20, 2000	Kitt Peak	Spacewatch	DOR	5.5 km	MPC · JPL
122934	2000 SS_{185}	—	September 21, 2000	Kitt Peak	Spacewatch	(12739)	3.1 km	MPC · JPL
122935	2000 SA_{186}	—	September 21, 2000	Kitt Peak	Spacewatch	·	2.4 km	MPC · JPL
122936	2000 SV_{186}	—	September 21, 2000	Haleakala	NEAT	·	2.5 km	MPC · JPL
122937	2000 SU_{187}	—	September 21, 2000	Haleakala	NEAT	PHO	3.7 km	MPC · JPL
122938	2000 SV_{189}	—	September 22, 2000	Haleakala	NEAT	·	2.0 km	MPC · JPL
122939	2000 SM_{191}	—	September 24, 2000	Socorro	LINEAR	·	3.5 km	MPC · JPL
122940	2000 SP_{191}	—	September 24, 2000	Socorro	LINEAR	V	1.6 km	MPC · JPL
122941	2000 SE_{192}	—	September 24, 2000	Socorro	LINEAR	·	3.8 km	MPC · JPL
122942	2000 SP_{192}	—	September 24, 2000	Socorro	LINEAR	·	1.4 km	MPC · JPL
122943	2000 SZ_{192}	—	September 24, 2000	Socorro	LINEAR	AGN	1.9 km	MPC · JPL
122944	2000 SA_{193}	—	September 24, 2000	Socorro	LINEAR	·	4.5 km	MPC · JPL
122945	2000 SA_{194}	—	September 24, 2000	Socorro	LINEAR	·	3.1 km	MPC · JPL
122946	2000 SL_{194}	—	September 24, 2000	Socorro	LINEAR	NYS ·	4.1 km	MPC · JPL
122947	2000 SH_{195}	—	September 24, 2000	Socorro	LINEAR	·	1.9 km	MPC · JPL
122948	2000 SU_{195}	—	September 24, 2000	Socorro	LINEAR	·	3.1 km	MPC · JPL
122949	2000 SC_{198}	—	September 24, 2000	Socorro	LINEAR	·	3.3 km	MPC · JPL
122950	2000 SD_{200}	—	September 24, 2000	Socorro	LINEAR	·	3.9 km	MPC · JPL
122951	2000 SY_{200}	—	September 24, 2000	Socorro	LINEAR	·	1.7 km	MPC · JPL
122952	2000 SY_{201}	—	September 24, 2000	Socorro	LINEAR	·	2.0 km	MPC · JPL
122953	2000 SD_{202}	—	September 24, 2000	Socorro	LINEAR	·	3.0 km	MPC · JPL
122954	2000 SA_{203}	—	September 24, 2000	Socorro	LINEAR	·	1.7 km	MPC · JPL
122955	2000 SU_{203}	—	September 24, 2000	Socorro	LINEAR	·	3.6 km	MPC · JPL
122956	2000 SU_{206}	—	September 24, 2000	Socorro	LINEAR	·	3.2 km	MPC · JPL
122957	2000 SW_{206}	—	September 24, 2000	Socorro	LINEAR	·	3.8 km	MPC · JPL
122958	2000 SX_{207}	—	September 24, 2000	Socorro	LINEAR	·	3.1 km	MPC · JPL
122959	2000 SQ_{210}	—	September 25, 2000	Socorro	LINEAR	·	2.3 km	MPC · JPL
122960	2000 SA_{213}	—	September 25, 2000	Socorro	LINEAR	·	2.3 km	MPC · JPL
122961	2000 SW_{214}	—	September 26, 2000	Socorro	LINEAR	·	1.4 km	MPC · JPL
122962	2000 SG_{215}	—	September 26, 2000	Socorro	LINEAR	L5	20 km	MPC · JPL
122963	2000 SK_{215}	—	September 26, 2000	Socorro	LINEAR	·	2.0 km	MPC · JPL
122964	2000 SD_{216}	—	September 26, 2000	Socorro	LINEAR	DOR	5.2 km	MPC · JPL
122965	2000 SF_{218}	—	September 26, 2000	Socorro	LINEAR	HNS	2.4 km	MPC · JPL
122966	2000 SN_{219}	—	September 26, 2000	Socorro	LINEAR	·	2.8 km	MPC · JPL
122967	2000 SS_{219}	—	September 26, 2000	Socorro	LINEAR	RAF	1.8 km	MPC · JPL
122968	2000 SO_{221}	—	September 26, 2000	Socorro	LINEAR	EUN	2.2 km	MPC · JPL
122969	2000 SW_{222}	—	September 27, 2000	Socorro	LINEAR	·	2.7 km	MPC · JPL
122970	2000 SU_{223}	—	September 27, 2000	Socorro	LINEAR	·	1.7 km	MPC · JPL
122971	2000 SQ_{225}	—	September 27, 2000	Socorro	LINEAR	·	2.5 km	MPC · JPL
122972	2000 ST_{228}	—	September 28, 2000	Socorro	LINEAR	·	2.6 km	MPC · JPL
122973	2000 SD_{229}	—	September 28, 2000	Socorro	LINEAR	·	2.7 km	MPC · JPL
122974	2000 SO_{229}	—	September 28, 2000	Socorro	LINEAR	·	2.5 km	MPC · JPL
122975	2000 SE_{230}	—	September 28, 2000	Socorro	LINEAR	·	2.0 km	MPC · JPL
122976	2000 SH_{230}	—	September 28, 2000	Socorro	LINEAR	MAS	1.5 km	MPC · JPL
122977	2000 SV_{230}	—	September 28, 2000	Socorro	LINEAR	·	2.5 km	MPC · JPL
122978	2000 SN_{234}	—	September 22, 2000	Socorro	LINEAR	·	2.4 km	MPC · JPL
122979	2000 SX_{234}	—	September 24, 2000	Socorro	LINEAR	·	1.9 km	MPC · JPL
122980	2000 SS_{238}	—	September 26, 2000	Socorro	LINEAR	·	4.7 km	MPC · JPL
122981	2000 SL_{239}	—	September 27, 2000	Socorro	LINEAR	·	3.3 km	MPC · JPL
122982	2000 SD_{241}	—	September 22, 2000	Socorro	LINEAR	EUN	2.1 km	MPC · JPL
122983	2000 SG_{242}	—	September 24, 2000	Socorro	LINEAR	NYS ·	3.1 km	MPC · JPL
122984	2000 SR_{242}	—	September 24, 2000	Socorro	LINEAR	(5)	2.0 km	MPC · JPL
122985	2000 SE_{244}	—	September 24, 2000	Socorro	LINEAR	·	1.8 km	MPC · JPL
122986	2000 SG_{244}	—	September 24, 2000	Socorro	LINEAR	·	2.2 km	MPC · JPL
122987	2000 SL_{244}	—	September 24, 2000	Socorro	LINEAR	NYS	2.2 km	MPC · JPL
122988	2000 SO_{244}	—	September 24, 2000	Socorro	LINEAR	MAS	1.9 km	MPC · JPL
122989	2000 ST_{245}	—	September 24, 2000	Socorro	LINEAR	·	2.9 km	MPC · JPL
122990	2000 SQ_{246}	—	September 24, 2000	Socorro	LINEAR	·	3.4 km	MPC · JPL
122991	2000 SE_{247}	—	September 24, 2000	Socorro	LINEAR	·	3.0 km	MPC · JPL
122992	2000 SN_{247}	—	September 24, 2000	Socorro	LINEAR	·	1.9 km	MPC · JPL
122993	2000 SR_{247}	—	September 24, 2000	Socorro	LINEAR	·	2.0 km	MPC · JPL
122994	2000 SN_{249}	—	September 24, 2000	Socorro	LINEAR	·	3.9 km	MPC · JPL
122995	2000 SK_{250}	—	September 24, 2000	Socorro	LINEAR	·	2.4 km	MPC · JPL
122996	2000 SN_{251}	—	September 24, 2000	Socorro	LINEAR	·	2.6 km	MPC · JPL
122997	2000 SZ_{251}	—	September 24, 2000	Socorro	LINEAR	(5)	2.0 km	MPC · JPL
122998	2000 SK_{252}	—	September 24, 2000	Socorro	LINEAR	·	1.9 km	MPC · JPL
122999	2000 SM_{252}	—	September 24, 2000	Socorro	LINEAR	NYS ·	3.5 km	MPC · JPL
123000	2000 SS_{252}	—	September 24, 2000	Socorro	LINEAR	MAS	1.3 km	MPC · JPL

back to top

== See also ==
- Meanings of minor-planet names: 122001–123000
