= Meanings of minor-planet names: 122001–123000 =

As minor planet discoveries are confirmed, they are given a permanent number by the IAU's Minor Planet Center (MPC), and the discoverers can then submit names for them, following the IAU's naming conventions. The list below concerns those minor planets in the specified number-range that have received names, and explains the meanings of those names.

Official naming citations of newly named small Solar System bodies are approved and published in a bulletin by IAU's Working Group for Small Bodies Nomenclature (WGSBN). Before May 2021, citations were published in MPC's Minor Planet Circulars for many decades. Recent citations can also be found on the JPL Small-Body Database (SBDB). Until his death in 2016, German astronomer Lutz D. Schmadel compiled these citations into the Dictionary of Minor Planet Names (DMP) and regularly updated the collection.

Based on Paul Herget's The Names of the Minor Planets, Schmadel also researched the unclear origin of numerous asteroids, most of which had been named prior to World War II. This article incorporates text from this source, which is in the public domain: SBDB New namings may only be added to this list below after official publication as the preannouncement of names is condemned. The WGSBN publishes a comprehensive guideline for the naming rules of non-cometary small Solar System bodies.

== 122001–122100 ==
Named minor planet	Provisional	This minor planet was named for...	Ref · Catalog
There are no named minor planets in this number range

== 122101–122200 ==
back to top

Named minor planet	Provisional	This minor planet was named for...	Ref · Catalog
There are no named minor planets in this number range

== 122201–122300 ==
back to top

Named minor planet	Provisional	This minor planet was named for...	Ref · Catalog
There are no named minor planets in this number range

== 122301–122400 ==
back to top

Named minor planet	Provisional	This minor planet was named for...	Ref · Catalog
There are no named minor planets in this number range

== 122401–122500 ==
back to top

Named minor planet	Provisional	This minor planet was named for...	Ref · Catalog
There are no named minor planets in this number range

== 122501–122600 ==
back to top

Named minor planet	Provisional	This minor planet was named for...	Ref · Catalog
122554 Joséhernández	2000 QS_{244}	José M. Hernández (born 1962) was born into a migrant farming family. He became an American astronaut and was a mission specialist on the Space Shuttle Discovery to the International Space Station in 2008. Prior to his time as an astronaut, Hernández helped to develop the first full-field digital mammography imaging system.	JPL · 122554
122555 Auñón-Chancellor	2000 QG_{249}	Serena Auñón-Chancellor (born 1976) is an engineer, physician, and astronaut. She has collected meteorites in Antarctica, served as an aquanaut on an undersea research station, and was a Flight Engineer on the International Space Station for 6 months in 2018.	JPL · 122555

== 122601–122700 ==
back to top

Named minor planet	Provisional	This minor planet was named for...	Ref · Catalog
122632 Riccioli	2000 RW_{78}	Giovanni Riccioli (1598–1671) was one of the first telescopic observers of the Moon. He was author of the Almagestum Novum, that contains a lunar map still used today.	IAU · 122632

== 122701–122800 ==
back to top

Named minor planet	Provisional	This minor planet was named for...	Ref · Catalog
There are no named minor planets in this number range

== 122801–122900 ==
back to top

Named minor planet	Provisional	This minor planet was named for...	Ref · Catalog
There are no named minor planets in this number range

== 122901–123000 ==
back to top

Named minor planet	Provisional	This minor planet was named for...	Ref · Catalog
There are no named minor planets in this number range

back to top

Preceded by 121,001–122,000	Meanings of minor-planet names List of minor planets: 122,001–123,000	Succeeded by 123,001–124,000
